= Vapalux =

Vapalux is a brand name for paraffin pressure lamps and lanterns (kerosene mantle lamps) developed and manufactured by Willis & Bates in Halifax, England, part of the United Kingdom.

== History ==
As a company, Willis & Bates dates back to the 1800s, moving to Halifax in the last few years of that century to take advantage of the engineering opportunities offered by the textile industry in the region. The current factory, named the Pellon Works, was built in Reservoir Road and was completed in 1900. Initially, the company made spun-metal parts for the textile industry but they soon diversified into making parts for other industries, particularly those of the gas and the rapidly developing electrical industries of the time. There is a possibility that one of the company's founders, Alfred Bates, was responsible for the design and manufacture of the military steel helmet, although this is unsubstantiated at present.

At the end of the First World War, Willis & Bates diversified further and became involved in the manufacture of parts for Petromax paraffin pressure lamps and lanterns. In 1925 they started making lamp and lantern parts for the Tilley company, a relationship which lasted until 1938 when Willis & Bates began manufacturing and selling lanterns on their own.

The Vapalux pressure lamp bears a close resemblance with the Tilley lamp, in the way the burner works and how the mantle is attached. This is not surprising given that the company had previously manufactured parts for Tilley, although many improvements were incorporated such as a captive preheater torch. The earliest model, the E41, was characterised by having an internal gallery and a plain ventilator with separate slots for air intake and exhaust, very much in the Petromax style. Again, this is probably a reflection of the earlier production work that had been done for Petromax.

Although this lantern took slightly longer to start, compared with some Petromax types made by Ehrich & Graetz which were equipped with rapid, blowlamp type preheaters, it burned for hours on end without needing attention, providing 300 cp (candle power) light output.

The Vapalux pressure lamp got a real boost when the Second World War started, as it was then issued as standard to the British army. This boost was enormous, and Willis & Bates produced up to 2000 lamps and lanterns per week.

In 1946, Willis & Bates began an association with Aladdin Industries of Greenford who marketed their output under the name 'Bialaddin' - thus the 'Vapalux' trade-name largely disappeared other than for some lanterns sold direct to the Army. Aladdin Industries of Greenford were also responsible for the development of the Bialaddin range of heater/radiators as well as the T10 and T20 table lamps, which rivalled the equivalent Tilley products of the time. In 1968, the association between Willis & Bates and Aladdin Industries of Greenford ended and Willis & Bates resumed the sale of their lanterns, and the name 'Vapalux' re-emerged.

== Today ==
Until 2010, Vapalux lanterns were being made at the Pellon Works in Halifax. Although in 1997, Willis & Bates ceased trading, another local company, Bairstow Brothers (1985) Limited bought the rights to make the lanterns. Vapalux (and Bialaddin lamps and lanterns), continue to deserve a reputation for being well-designed and engineered as well as being totally reliable in use.

In early 2010, after the British army started to purchase battery lanterns instead and did not renew the contract, the Vapalux and Willis & Bates Brand and the tooling and IP rights for its manufacture were sold to a Korean manufacturer. All manufacturing will be transferred to the new owner and not continued in Great Britain.

== Vapalux models ==
- E41 approximately 1938–1941
- 300 Army issue model, 1938–1946
- 21C Armed Forces issue, late 1940s onwards
- 300X 1938–1946, becoming the Bialaddin 300X from that year
- M1 (Also marketed as model 305 Bialaddin for Aladdin Industries of Greenford UK) 1945–1968
- M320 (Called M1 when Army issue) 1968–present (as of 2024)
- M1B Retro look civilian lamp, 1990–present (as of 2024)

== See also ==
- Kerosene lamp
