= Tilley lamp =

Pressurized kerosene lamps made by the Tilley company in the UK

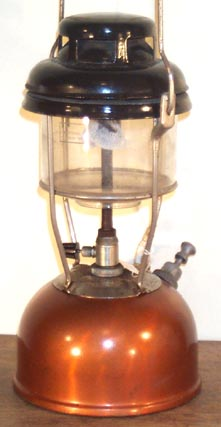
Tilley storm lantern X246B May 1978: this model has been in production since 1964.

Operation of a Tilley lamp (Video)

Large Tilley radiator R55 from 1957

Tilley Lamp TL10 from 1922-1946

The Tilley lamp is a kerosene pressure lamp.

== History ==
In 1813, John Tilley invented the hydro-pneumatic blowpipe. In 1818, William Henry Tilley, gas fitters, was manufacturing gas lamps in Stoke Newington, and, in the 1830s, in Shoreditch.

In 1846, Abraham Pineo Gesner invented coal oil, a substitute for whale oil for lighting, distilled from coal. Kerosene, made from petroleum, later became a popular lighting fuel. In 1853, most versions of the kerosene lamp were invented by Polish inventor and pharmacist Ignacy Łukasiewicz, in Lviv. It was a significant improvement over lamps designed to burn vegetable or sperm oil.

On 23 September 1885, Carl Auer von Welsbach received a patent on the gas flame heated incandescent mantle light.

In 1914, the Coleman Lantern, a similar pressure lamp was introduced by the US Coleman Company.

In 1915, during World War I, the Tilley company moved to Brent Street in Hendon, and began developing a kerosene pressure lamp.

In 1919, Tilley High-Pressure Gas Company started using kerosene as a fuel for lamps.

In the 1920s, Tilley company got a contract to supply lamps to railways, and made domestic lamps.

During World War II, Armed Forces purchased quantities of lamps, thus many sailors, soldiers and airmen used a Tilley Lamp.

After World War II, demand for Tilley Lamps drove expansion to a second factory, in Cricklewood, then a third, merged, single factory in Colindale.

The company moved to Northern Ireland in the early 1960s, finally settling in Belfast. It moved back to England in 2000.

== Competing lamps ==
- Aladdin Industries
- Bat lamps
- Bialaddin lamps
- Coleman Company
- Fama lamps
- Optimus lamps
- Petromax
- Primus stove
- Solar lamps
- Vapalux
- Veritas lamps

== See also ==
- Davy lamp
- Naphtha flare
