= Naphtha flare =

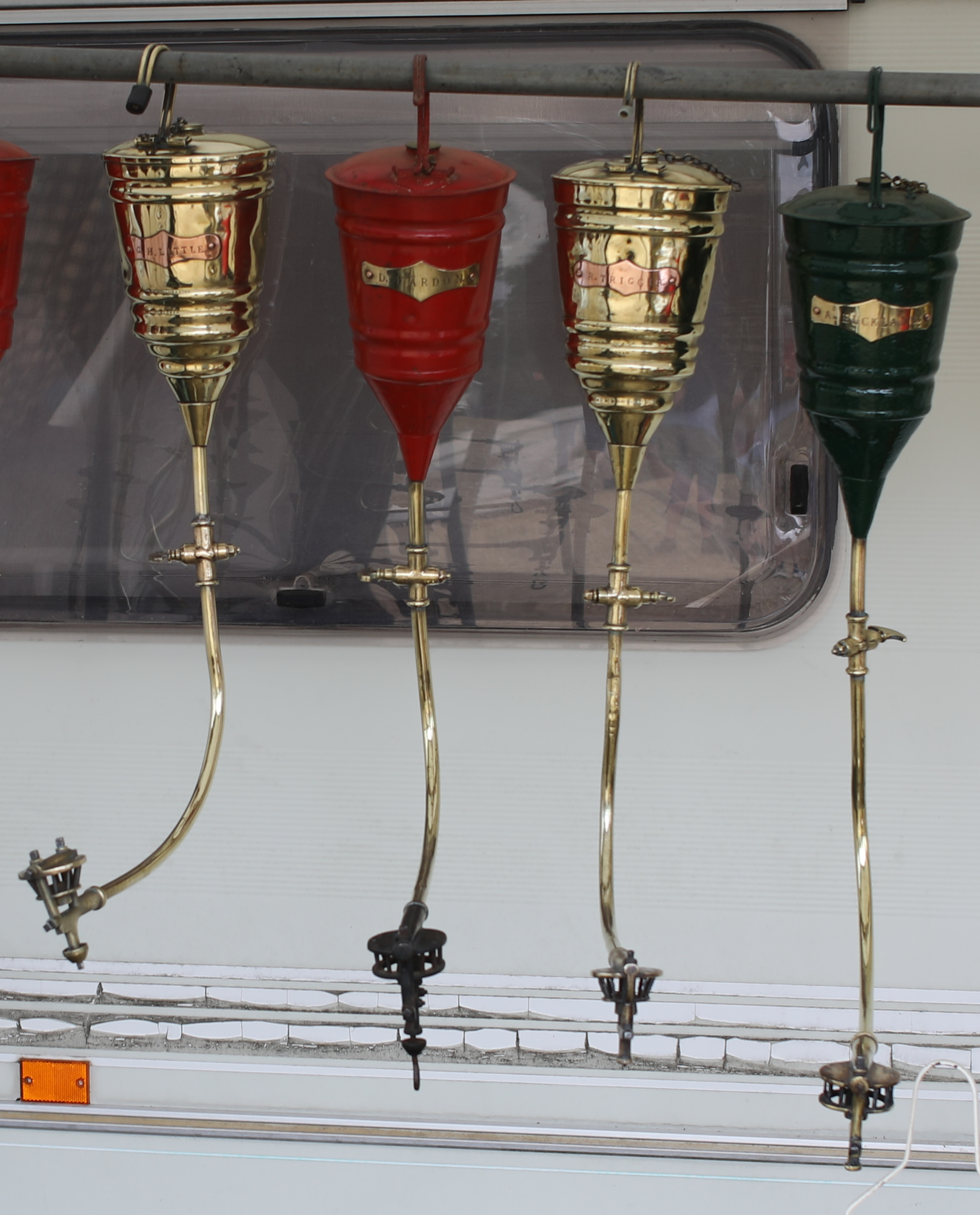
Unlit naphtha flare lamps

The naphtha flare lamps is a forerunner of widely known high pressure paraffin lamps such as Coleman, Tilley, and Petromax. Patented in 1848, they were widely used by showmen, market-stall holders, and circuses until World War I, although some were still in use in London markets such as Queens Road up to and during World War II. Naphtha (a hydrocarbon) became available as a by-product when town gas was produced from coal.

A flare lamp is gravity fed and has no wick. The liquid fuel evaporates in the preheated burner. The fuel line runs through the burner and when the burner reaches a temperature between 80 and 100 degrees Celsius the naphtha evaporates and gives a flame after the tap is opened. In case the flame goes out, for example by strong wind, the tank runs dry, resulting in a puddle of hydrocarbon on the floor, providing the tap is not closed. They were therefore a fire-hazard.
