= Max Graetz =

German businessman and inventor

Max Graetz (1861-1936) was the President/CEO of the Ehrich & Graetz firm in Berlin. He was also the main inventor.

Between 1900-1916 he invented the Petromax lantern.

Ehrich & Graetz was a big metalworks firm until the Second World War.

== See also ==
- Kerosene lamp
- Petromax
