= Scanoe =

Brand of boat by Coleman Company

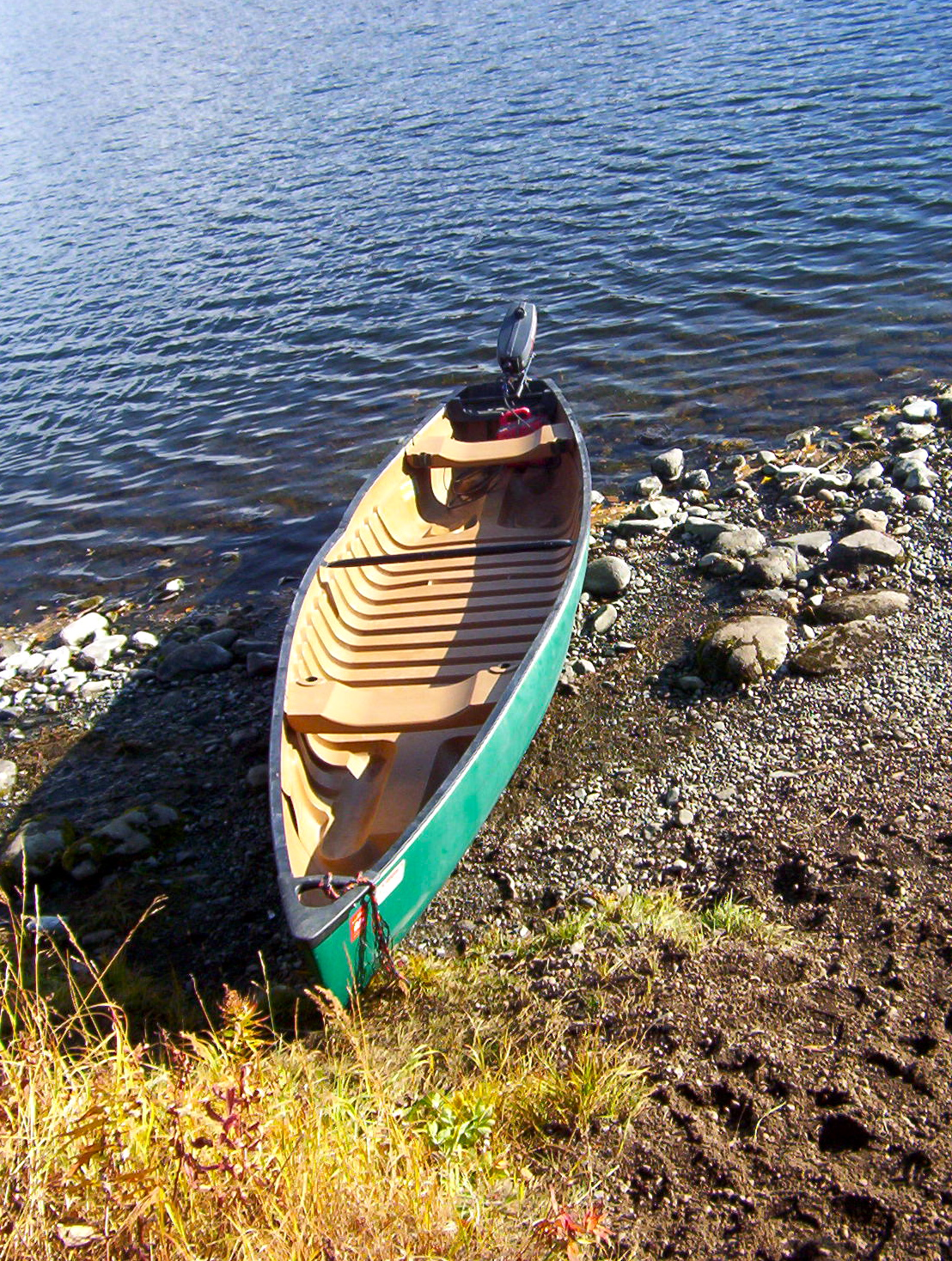
Interior view

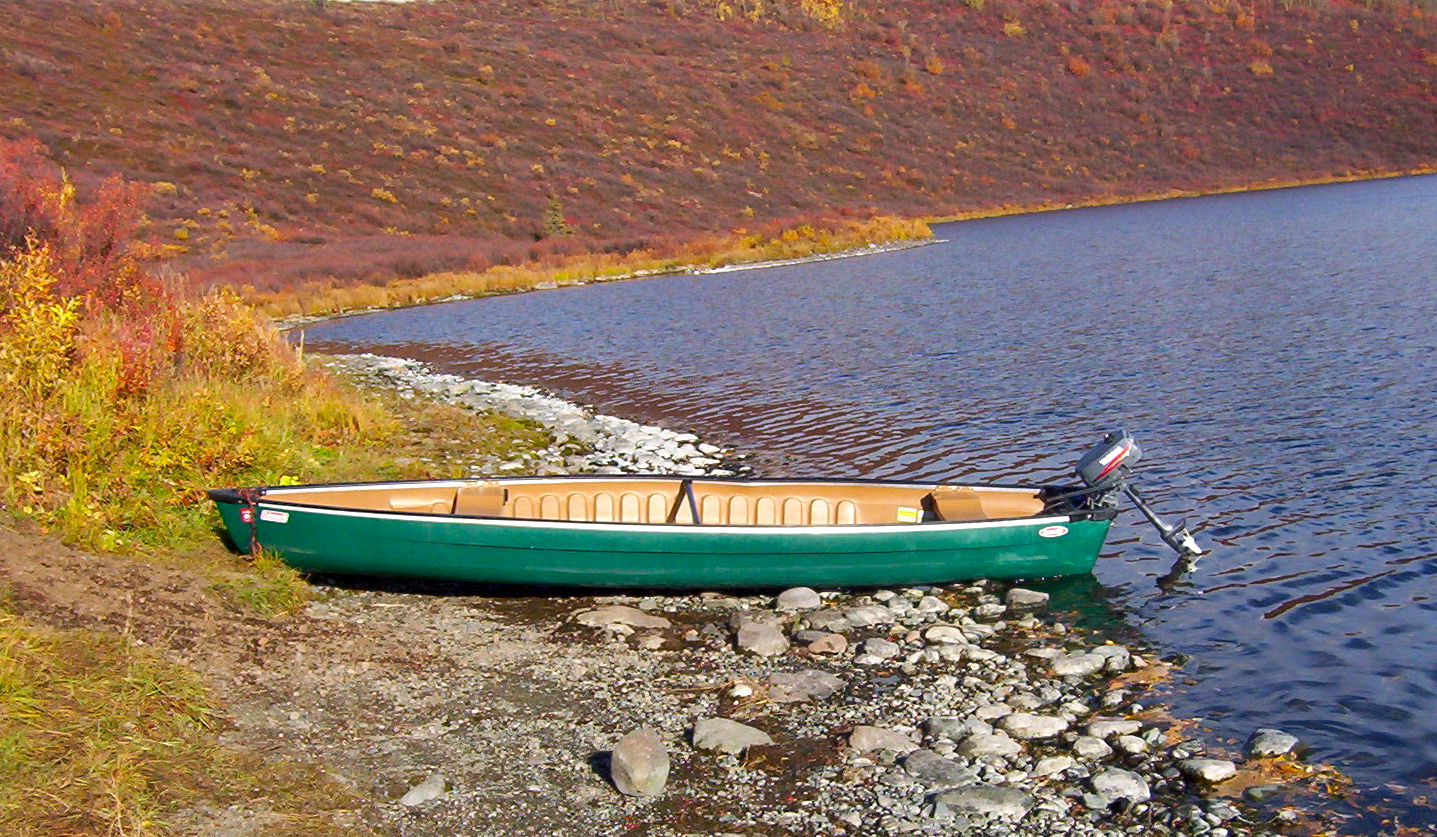
Profile showing 2 horsepower (1.5 kW) outboard motor

A Scanoe is a brand of boat originally built and named by Coleman, debuted in the 1980's. It is a cross between a skiff and a canoe. It is wider than a conventional canoe and has a flat stern so that a small outboard motor can be mounted if needed, but it is lightweight enough (about 120 pounds (54 kg)) to be portaged or transported on a vehicle roof as opposed to on a trailer.

The Scanoe debuted in 1985 with a horsepower rating of 1.75 and a width of 38 inches, in 1989 the transom capacity was upped to 5 horsepower and the width was increased to 40 and then 43 inches. Later the Scanoe was produced with Coleman's Ram X plastic. Later Pelican bought the brand name from Coleman in approximately 2001 and tried the concept but dropped it a few years later. The term remained and remains in some use often referred to as a "Scout canoe". The term loosely refers to a square stern canoe, albeit usually with some association with the Coleman and Pelican versions.
