= Candoluminescence =

Heat-induced luminescence not from stored energy

Candoluminescence is the light given off by certain materials at elevated temperatures (usually when exposed to a flame) that has an intensity at some wavelengths which can, through chemical action in flames or other physical effects, be higher than the blackbody emission expected from incandescence at the same temperature. The phenomenon is notable in certain transition-metal and rare-earth oxide materials (ceramics) such as zinc oxide, cerium(IV) oxide and thorium dioxide.

== History ==
The existence of the candoluminescence phenomenon and the underlying mechanism have been the subject of extensive research and debate since the first reports of it in the 1800s. The topic was of particular interest before the introduction of electric lighting, when most artificial light was produced by fuel combustion. The main alternative explanation for candoluminescence is that it is simply "selective" thermal emission in which the material has a very high emissivity in the visible spectrum and a very weak emissivity in the part of the spectrum where the blackbody thermal emission would be highest; in such a system, the emitting material will tend to retain a higher temperature because of the lack of invisible radiative cooling. In this scenario, observations of candoluminescence would simply have been underestimating the temperature of the emitting material. Several authors in the 1950s came to the view that candoluminescence was simply an instance of selective thermal emission, and one of the most prominent researchers in the field, V. A. Sokolov, once advocated eliminating the term from the literature in his noted 1952 review article, only to revise his view several years later. The modern scientific consensus is that candoluminescence does occur, that it is not always simply due to selective thermal emission, but the mechanisms vary depending on the materials involved and the method of heating, particularly the type of flame and the position of the material relative to the flame.

== Mechanism ==
When the fuel in a flame combusts, the energy released by the combustion process is deposited in combustion products, usually molecular fragments called free radicals. The combustion products are excited to a very high temperature called the adiabatic flame temperature (that is, the temperature before any heat has been transferred away from the combustion products). This temperature is usually much higher than the temperature of the air in the flame or which an object inserted into the flame can reach. When the combustion products lose this energy by radiative emission, the radiation can thus be more intense than that of a lower-temperature blackbody inserted into the flame. The exact emission process involved varies with the material, the type of fuels and oxidizers, and the type of flame, though in many cases it is well established that the free radicals undergo radiative recombination. This energetic light emitted directly from the combustion products may be observed directly (as with a blue gas flame), depending on the wavelength, or it may then cause fluorescence in the candoluminescent material. Some free-radical recombinations emit ultraviolet light, which is only observable through fluorescence.

One important candoluminescence mechanism is that the candoluminescent material catalyzes the recombination, enhancing the intensity of the emission. Extremely narrow-wavelength emission by the combustion products is often an important feature in this process, because it reduces the rate at which the free radicals lose heat to radiation at invisible or non-fluorescence-exciting wavelengths. In other cases, the excited combustion products are thought to directly transfer their energy to luminescent species in the solid material. In any case, the key feature of candoluminescence is that the combustion products lose their energy to radiation without becoming thermalized with the environment, which allows the effective temperature of their radiation to be much higher than that of thermal emission from materials in thermal equilibrium with the environment.

== Welsbach lights ==
Early in the 20th century, there was vigorous debate over whether candoluminescence is required to explain the behavior of Welsbach gas mantles or limelight. One counterargument was that since thorium oxide (for example) has much lower emissivity in the near infrared region than the shorter wavelength parts of the visible spectrum, it should not be strongly cooled by infrared radiation, and thus a thorium-oxide mantle can get closer to the flame temperature than can a blackbody material. The higher temperature would then lead to higher emission levels in the visible portion of the spectrum, without invoking candoluminescence as an explanation.

Another argument was that the oxides in the mantle might be actively absorbing the combustion products and thus being selectively raised to combustion-product temperatures. Some more recent authors seem to have concluded that neither Welsbach mantles nor limelight involve candoluminescence (e.g. Mason), but Ivey, in an extensive review of 254 sources, concluded that catalysis of free-radical recombination does enhance the emission of Welsbach mantles, such that they are candoluminescent.

== See also ==
- Incandescent light bulb – Electric light bulb with a resistively heated wire filament
- Thermoluminescence – Light from the re-emission of absorbed energy when a substance is heated
