= Zirconia light =

Chemical light

A zirconia light is an intensely brilliant chemical light produced by incandescent zirconia. It is similar in design to the Drummond light (limelight), but uses a block of zirconia instead of quicklime. Both have been replaced by the electric light.
