= Petromax =

Brand of paraffin lamp

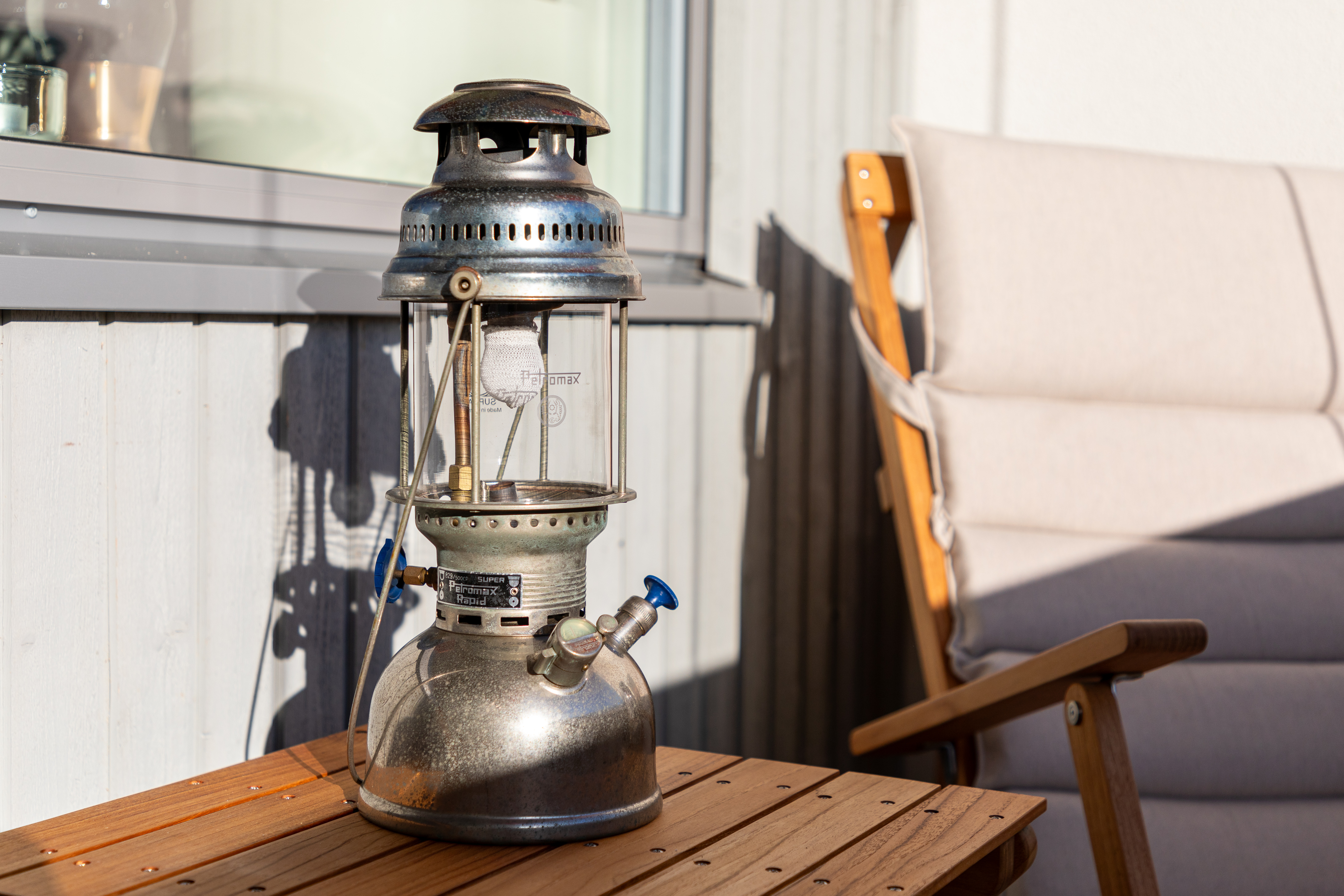
Petromax 829/500CP, a paraffin pressure lantern

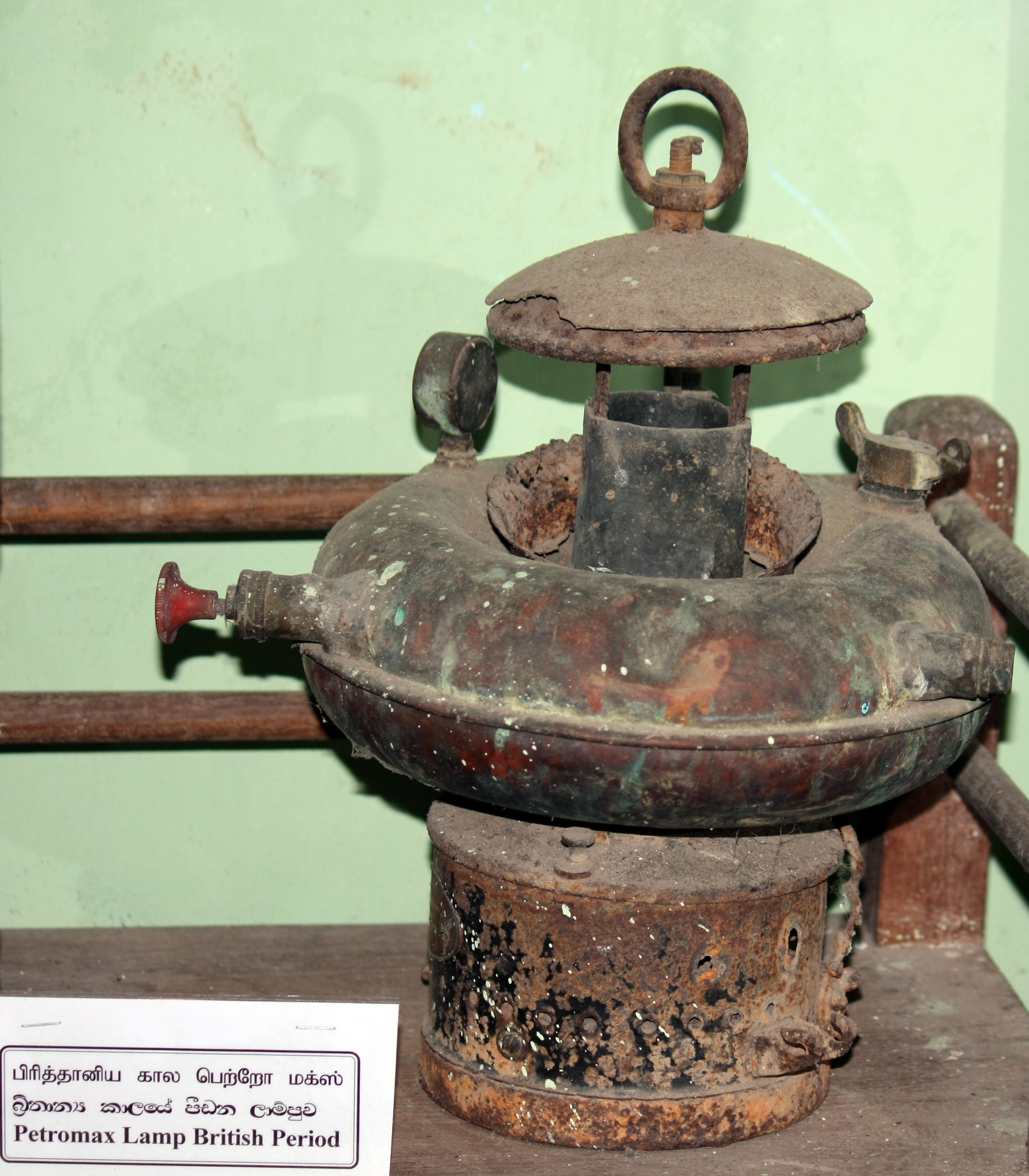
A Petromax lantern from the British colonial period at the Batticaloa Museum

Petromax was one of the brand names from Ehrich & Graetz. The company used it for their pressurised kerosene lamp that uses a incandescent mantle. They are as synonymous with the paraffin lamp in Continental Europe as Tilley lamps are in Britain and Coleman lanterns are in the United States. Today's company Petromax GmbH sells not only pressurised paraffin lamps but also other products for camping and outdoor use.

== History ==
The Petromax lamp was created in 1910 in Germany by Max Graetz (1851–1937), who also named the brand, on the basis of a spirit lamp that was already well-known. Graetz was president of the firm Ehrich & Graetz in Berlin, which developed the lamp, and also the primary designer. On April 9th, 1921 the company applied for a German patent (DE365530) for a lantern design using a vertical vaporizer. This was very close to the design form as is used nowadays.

He had wanted to create a lighting system fueled by paraffin, which was then a new product. Graetz invented a process to make a gas out of paraffin; which has a very high caloric value and could make a very hot blue flame.

Graetz then designed a pressure lamp, working with vaporized paraffin. To start this process, the lamp was preheated with methylated spirit (denatured alcohol), in later models with an integrated blow torch called "Rapidstarter" running from the paraffin tank directly. In a closed tank, paraffin was pressurised with a hand pump. The heat produced by the mantle was then used to vaporize the paraffin, which is mixed with air and blown in to mantle to burn. Around the year 1916, the lantern and its name started to spread around the world. The name Petromax derives from "Petroleum" and "Max Graetz".

The design was such a success that it still is being used to this day. The name Petromax has become synonymous with paraffin pressure lamps in many countries. The design of the lamps was later used to create a cooker based on the same principles. The Petromax design has been often copied, today such as by Tower in China, Lea Hin in Indonesia or Prabhat in India.

The current company Petromax GmbH was founded in 2010 by the German entrepreneur Jonas Taureck. Through a number of detours, the Petromax trademark for both Europe and North America came in the hands of this company. It not only sells pressure paraffin lamps, but also other products for camping and outdoor use.

== Typical problems ==
Petromax is reliable and efficient light source but only with proper use and well maintained. Typical problems leading to malfunction of the lantern:

- Misuse (no sufficient pre-heating or forgetting to pressurise the fuel tank)
- Broken seals or loose joints or leakage in the container (pressure and/or fuel leaks at the wrong place)
- Damaged glow sock (there should not be a single hole in the sock)
- Inefficient pump / dried or worn out leather cap of the pump (the container does not get pressurised, leather grain may get stuck in between the pump valve, when valve is not holding and kerosene flows by the pump shaft hole. Leather grains will be also in the tank).
- Clogged carburettor tube or nozzle (fuel does not flow to the glow sock)
- Broken, bent or worn out nozzle needle or worn out nozzle hole. (Lantern will burn 'rich' with worn out needle - hole clearance. Too much kerosene flows to the glow sock. Flames go outside of the glow sock and black areas are formed at sock weaving).
- Wrong fuel (use only kerosene, burning of fuel oil or diesel is too impure and trying to use gasoline or alcohol is devastating and even dangerous).

== See also ==
- Kerosene lamp
- List of light sources
