= William Coffin Coleman =

American businessman (1870–1957)

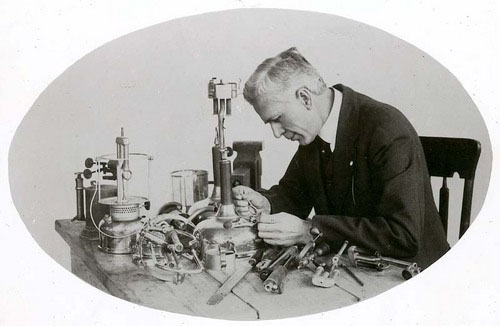
- Coleman circa 1920

25th Mayor of Wichita, Kansas
- In office 1923–1924
- Preceded by: George Henry Hamilton
- Succeeded by: Benjamin Franklin McLean

Personal details
- Born: October 20, 1870 Chatham, New York, USA
- Died: November 2, 1957 (aged 87) Wichita, Kansas, USA
- Cause of death: Acute myocardial infarction
- Resting place: Old Mission Mausoleum, Wichita, Kansas; 37.725°N 97.297°W
- Education: Emporia State University
- Known for: Founder of Coleman Company

William Coffin Coleman (May 21, 1870 – November 2, 1957) was a businessman, the American founder of the Coleman Company, a maker of camping equipment, and a politician. He served as the Mayor of Wichita, Kansas, from 1923 to 1924.

== Biography ==
Coleman was born in Chatham, New York, in 1870. His parents moved the family to Labette County, Kansas, in 1871, and in 1881 his father died. William started earning money by selling small goods as a child.

Later in life, Coleman aimed to become a lawyer. He obtained a job as a salesman to pay for his education.

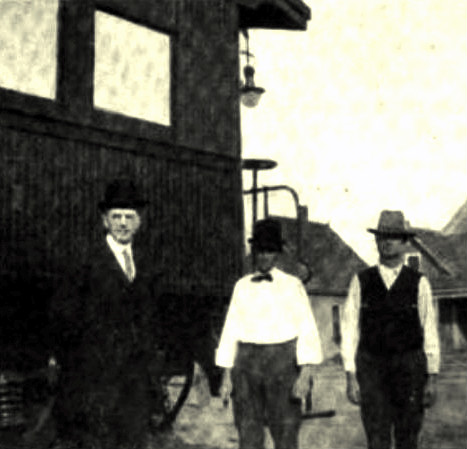
Coleman with two of his employees standing in front of a Baptist railroad chapel car in Wichita, Kansas (1911).

While selling typewriters in Alabama, Coleman saw a lantern that used gasoline instead of kerosene. He switched his sales to lanterns, believing these would be useful. He began to craft his own lantern, which he marketed as the Coleman Arc Lamp.

In 1901 Coleman married Fanny Sheldon and they moved to Wichita, Kansas. They had two children: Sheldon and Clarence Coleman.

Coleman also developed what he called the G.I. pocket stove, in addition to the gasoline lamp. The business was now called the Coleman Lamp and Stove Company. after two decades in Wichita, Coleman entered politics, joining the Republican Party. He was elected as mayor of Wichita for one two-year term, serving 1923 through 1924.

Coleman died in Wichita, Kansas, on November 2, 1957, from a heart attack. He is buried in Old Mission Mausoleum, Wichita, Kansas.

== See also ==
- Coleman Lantern
- G.I. pocket stove
