= Ehrich & Graetz =

Manufacturing company based in Berlin

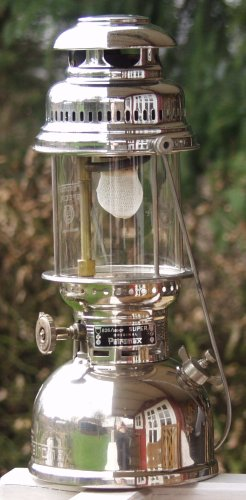
- Built: 1866
- Location: Berlin, Germany
- Industry: Metalworking
- Owners: Albert Graetz and Emil Ehrich

The Ehrich & Graetz metalworks was a factory established in 1866 in Berlin by Albert Graetz (1831–1901) and the tradesman Emil Ehrich (died 1887) under the name "Lampen-Fabrik Ehrich & Graetz OHG" (E&G). The logo of the firm was two seahorse-looking dragons with a sun between them, and the firm's initials of E&G. The brand is now owned by Nokia of Finland.

== Ehrich & Graetz factory ==
In the beginning kerosene lamps along with burners, as well as cookers for fluid (wood alcohol, paraffin), gaseous fuels (town gas, propane, and natural gas) were made in the Lampen-Fabrik Ehrich & Graetz OHG (E&G) factory. By 1897 the firm was controlled by Albert's sons Max and Adolf Graetz. The company grew rapidly, and in 1899 a factory complex was built in the Elsenstrasse in Berlin. At that time the company had establishments in the United States, France, the UK, and Bombay in British India. Around 1910-1916 Max Graetz developed the famous Petromax lantern. From around 1925 the factory also produced radios and other electrical appliances under the name Graetzor. In 1928 Fritz Graetz (son of Max) took over the management of the firm.

== World War I ==
During the First World War (1914-1918) the company initially had difficulties because many employees and also some members of the Graetz family fought in the war. The company was converted to produce equipment for the army. This included ammunition. E&G stampings can be found on 7.92×57mm Mauser cartridges, cartridge holders for this Mauser Gewehr 98 ammunition, fuses for artillery shells, and flare cartridges for the Hebel Model 1894 flare pistol. Another typical product from these war years is the Kriegslichtbrenner (War Light Burner). This was an oil lamp with a glow mantle that worked on methylated spirits. The lamp was made in such a way that it could be screwed onto existing oil reservoirs of petroleum lamps. In this way, people could convert their petroleum lamps into methylated spirit lamps themselves. This was done because of the shortages of petroleum caused by import blockades. The lamp was an initiative of the government and was produced at several lamp factories. Including Hugo Schneider AG and Hirschhorn AG.

== World War II ==
In the Second World War, just as in the First World War, the company was part of the war industry. With the use of forced laborers from Germany, France, Russia, and the Netherlands the company made huge gains in production. Some notable examples of the forced labourers were

•Ruth Arndt-Gumpel

• Elisabeth Freund (who would go on write down her experiences at the factory)

• Leopold Chones the leader of a Jewish resistance movement, Chug Chaluzi (Pioneer Circle)

• Stella Goldschlag.

Around 1942 the first letter "E" in the company logo was dropped leaving only the second letter "G." On the 27th of February 1943 the Jewish forced laborers were taken away by the SS in the so called" Fabrikaktion". At the end of April 1945 the factory was claimed by the Russian army.

At the end of 1945 the factory was running again, but only producing pots, pans, and other small metal work.

== Volkseigener Betrieb ==
When Berlin was divided into East and West Berlin, the factory buildings in the Elssenstrasse ended up in East Berlin and thus in the Russian occupation zone. The Berlin Wall ran through Heidelbergerstrasse, which intersects Elsenstrasse, past the site. The Russians turn many companies into State-owned companies in the form of a so-called "Volkseigener Betrieb - (VEB)". From 8 February 1948 the company is called "VEB Graetz-Werk" and from 4 February 1950 "VEB Fernmeldewerk Treptow". On 1 July 1953, VEB Fernmeldewerk Treptow merges with VEB Signalbau Berlin to form the newly formed VEB Werk für Signal- und Sicherungstechnik Berlin (WSSB). After the German reunification, Siemens AG took over the site on Elsenstrasse.

== Graetz AG ==
In 1948 Erich, and Fritz Graetz founded a new company in Altena in the British occupation zone, known by the name Graetz AG, as a successor to the lost family company in Berlin. The new company produced mainly radios and televisions. However the Petromax, the paraffin pressure lamp invented and designed by Max Graetz, was also produced here in great numbers. The remarkable economic boom of companies in West Germany was called the so-called Wirtschaftswunder. In 1952, the company GRAETZ Strahlungsmeßtechnik GmbH was founded from a R&D group within Graetz KG. This was to produce radiation measuring equipment such as Geiger counters. The company still exists in 2024 and is still located in Altena.

In 1961 the company was sold to Standard Elektrik Lorenz (SEL) AG (at that time part of the ITT group), and is owned since 1987 by the Finnish company Nokia.

== See also ==
- Kerosene lamp
