= Limelight =

Type of stage lighting once used in theatres and music halls

A diagram of a limelight burner

Limelight (also known as Drummond light or calcium light) is a non-electric type of stage lighting that was once used in theatres and music halls. An intense illumination is created when a flame fed by oxygen and hydrogen is directed at a cylinder of quicklime (calcium oxide), due to a combination of incandescence and candoluminescence.

Although it has long since been replaced by electric lighting, the term has survived, as someone in the public eye is still said to be "in the limelight". The actual lamps are called "limes", a term which has been transferred to electrical equivalents.

== History ==
=== Discovery and invention ===
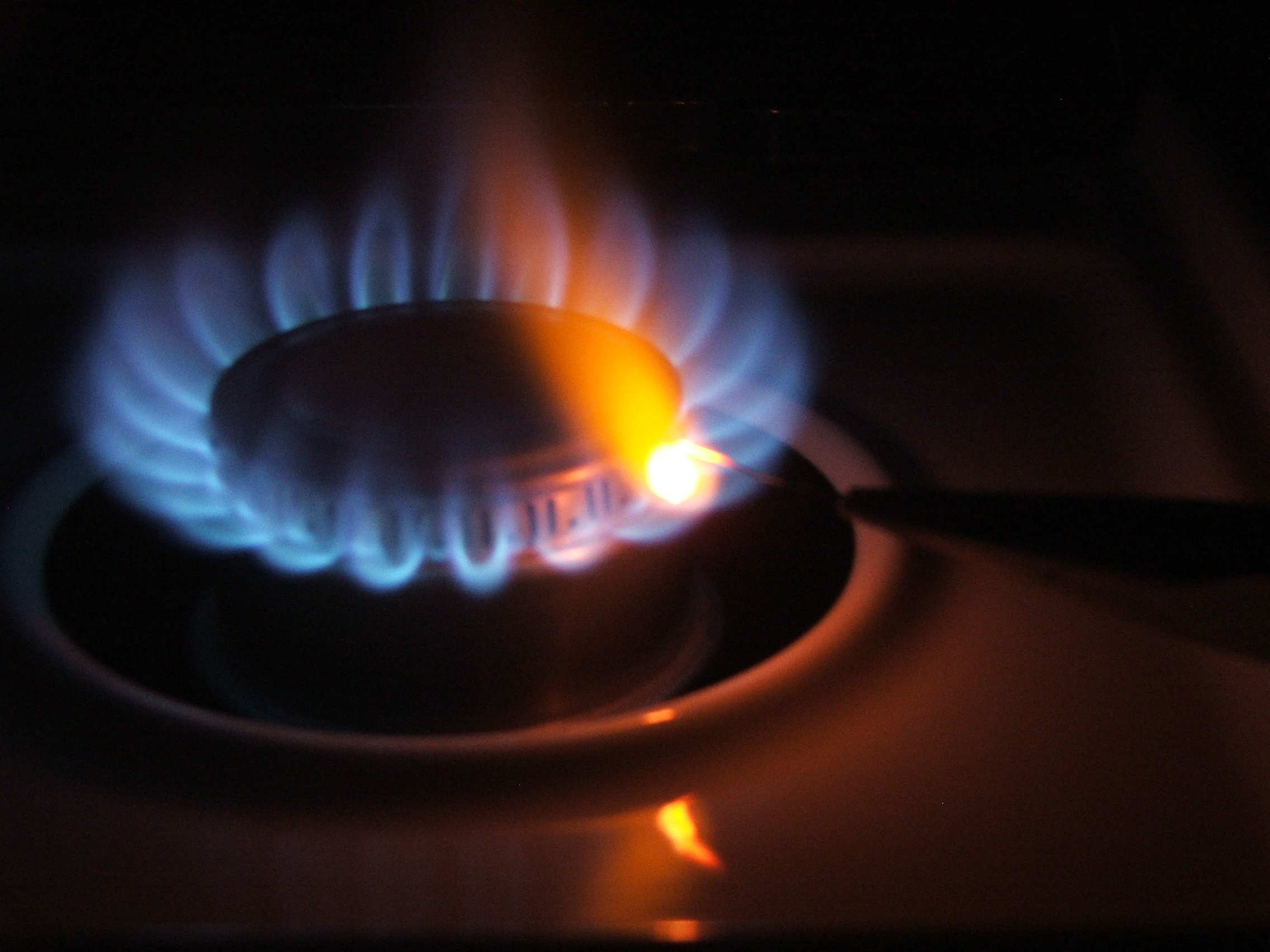
Heating calcium hydroxide (slaked lime) in a stove burner causes it to glow, although this is not as bright as a real limelight.

The limelight effect was discovered in the 1820s by Goldsworthy Gurney, based on his work with the "oxy-hydrogen blowpipe", credit for which is normally given to Robert Hare. In 1825, Scottish engineer Thomas Drummond (1797–1840) saw a demonstration of the effect by Michael Faraday and realized that the light would be useful for surveying. Drummond built a working version in 1826. The device is sometimes called the Drummond light after his adaptation of Gurney's discovery.

=== Early use in Europe ===
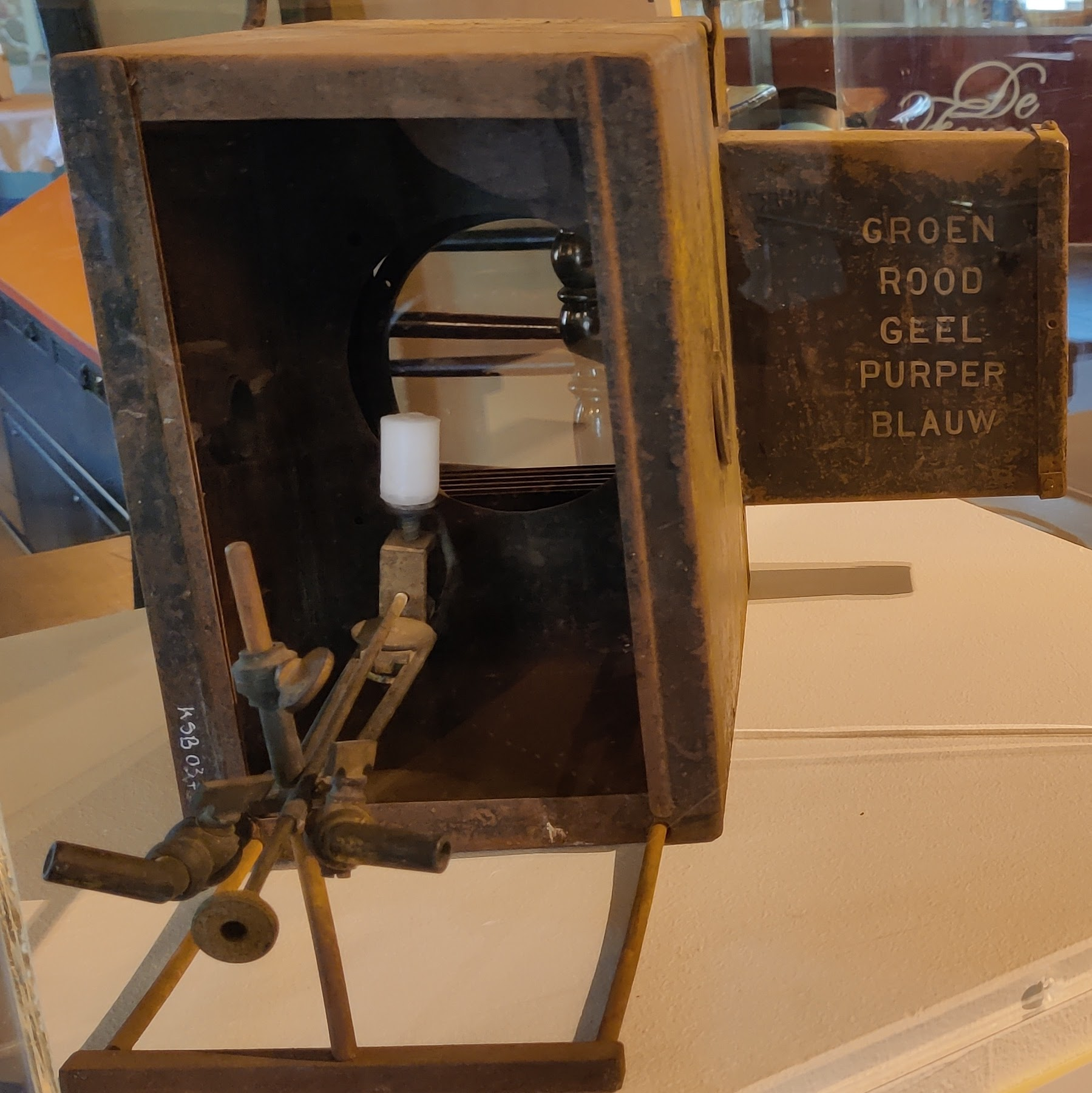
A 19th century limelight used for stage lighting. Collection: Stadsschouwburg (city theatre) Bruges, Belgium.

The earliest known use of limelight at a public performance was outdoors, over Herne Bay Pier, Kent, on the night of 3 October 1836, to illuminate a juggling performance by magician Ching Lau Lauro. This performance was part of the celebrations following the laying of the foundation stone of the Clock Tower. The playbill called it koniaphostic light and announced that "the whole pier is overwhelmed with a flood of beautiful white light".

Limelight was first used for indoor stage illumination in the Covent Garden Theatre in London in 1837 and enjoyed widespread use in theatres around the world in the 1860s and 1870s. Limelights were employed to highlight solo performers in the same manner as modern spotlights.

=== Early use in the United States ===
During the American Civil War, in July and August 1863, calcium lights were used during the siege of Fort Wagner, allowing Union forces to illuminate their artillery target at night while supposedly blinding Confederate gunners and riflemen. Calcium lights were also installed on Union Navy ships.

=== Early use in Australia ===
In Australia, limelight was adopted in the late 19th century for use in theatres, public lectures, and illustrated presentations. One of the most significant developments occurred in 1892, when the Salvation Army established the Limelight Department in Melbourne, Victoria.

Initially functioning as a photographic and lantern-slide studio, the department evolved into one of the world’s earliest film production units. It produced hundreds of short films and pioneering multimedia presentations, including Soldiers of the Cross (1900), and recorded notable events such as the inauguration of the Australian Commonwealth in 1901.

The Limelight Department’s work is regarded as foundational to the development of Australian cinema. Limelight technology was gradually replaced by electric arc lighting in the late 19th century as more efficient and safer illumination methods became available.

== See also ==
- Black-body radiation – Thermal electromagnetic radiation
- Timeline of hydrogen technologies
- List of light sources – Devices and processes that produce light
- Zirconia light – Chemical light
- Nineteenth-century theatrical scenery
- Klieg light – Carbon arc lamp

== Bibliography ==
- Bundock, Mike (2000). Herne Bay Clock Tower: A Descriptive History. Herne Bay: Pierhead Publications. ISBN 978-0953897704.
- Art Gallery of South Australia History of Limelights
