= Clamond basket =

Kind of gas mantle

A Clamond basket is a kind of gas mantle, invented in the 1880s by the Parisian Charles Clamond, and which he later patented in the United States. It was the first economically practical gas mantle, since prior mantles had involved expensive materials like platinum and iridium.

== Producing the gauze ==
A dense water-based slurry of magnesium hydroxide and magnesium acetate is forced through a small hole in a metal plate. On exposure to air it solidifies sufficiently to make a thread which is shaped into the required form.

== Use ==
When exposed to a hot flame, a basket made of this composite gauze would burn away the acetate, leaving a brittle but serviceable magnesia (magnesium oxide) basket behind as the mantle. Charles Lungren subsequently patented a support mechanism which allowed such fragile baskets to be employed more easily. Clamond filed a related patent which deals with production, storage, and transport-proofing mantles.
