= Gas mantle =

Device for generating bright light when heated by a flame

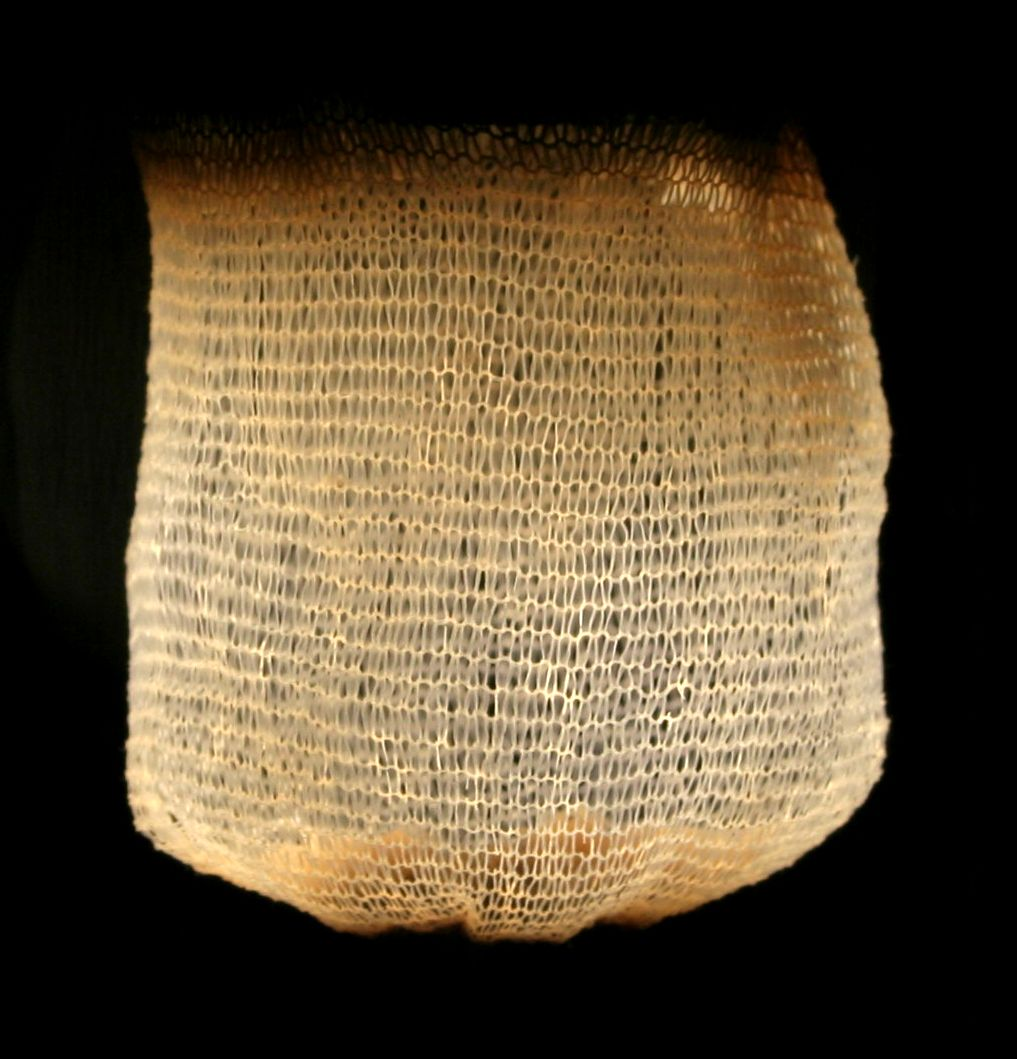
A Coleman white gas lantern mantle glowing at full brightness

An incandescent gas mantle, gas mantle or Welsbach mantle is a device for generating bright white light when heated by a flame. The name refers to its original heat source in gas lights which illuminated the streets of Europe and North America in the late 19th century. Mantle refers to the way it hangs like a cloak above the flame. Gas mantles are also used in some portable camping lanterns, pressure lanterns and some oil lamps.

Gas mantles are usually sold as a fabric bag which, because of impregnation with metal nitrates, burns away to leave a rigid but fragile mesh of metal oxides when heated during initial use; these metal oxides produce light from the heat of the flame whenever used. Thorium dioxide was commonly a major component; being radioactive, it has led to concerns about the safety of those involved in manufacturing mantles. Normal use, however, poses minimal health risk.

== Mechanism ==
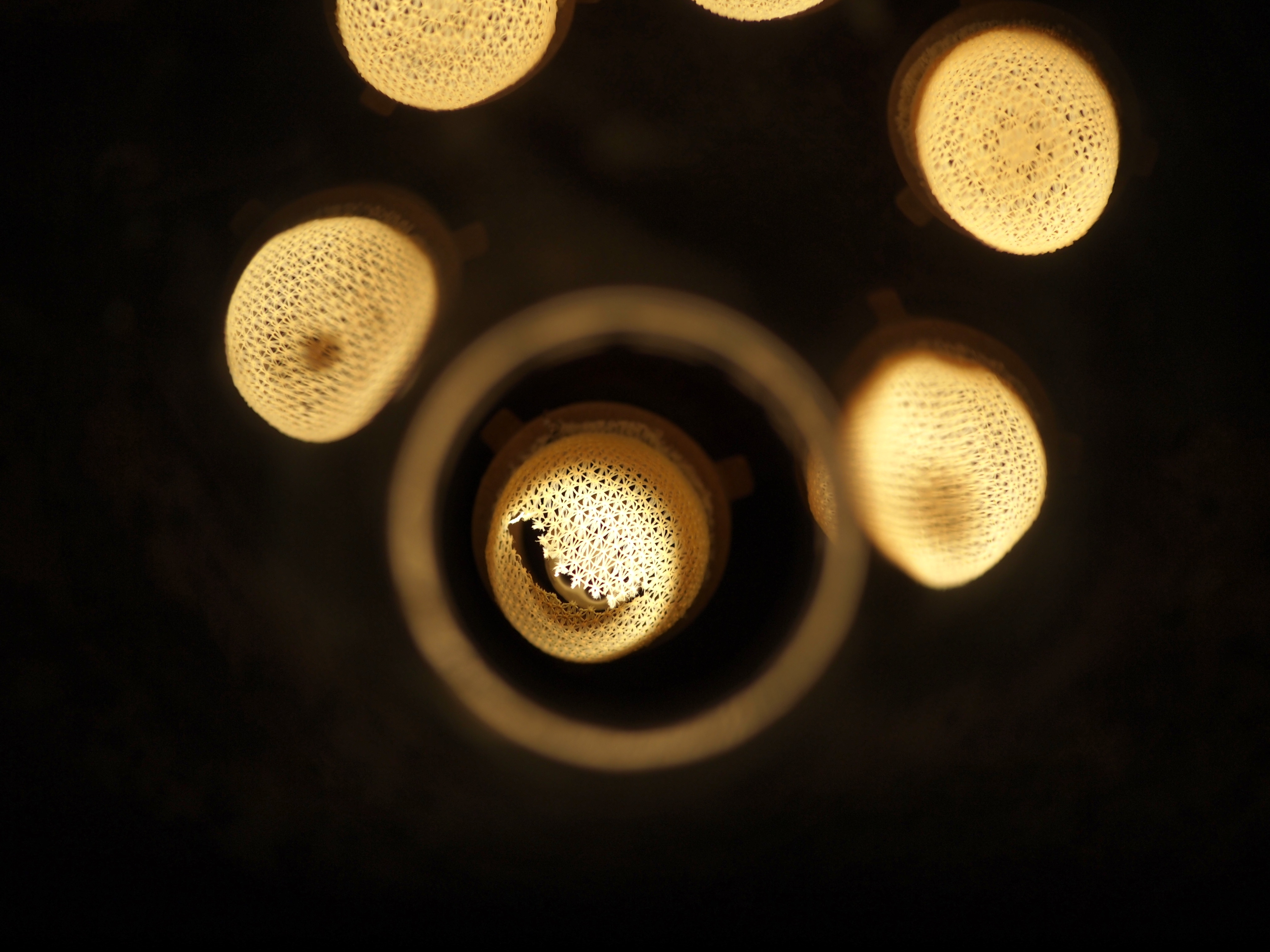
Hot gas mantles. The lowest visible mantle has partially broken, reducing its light output

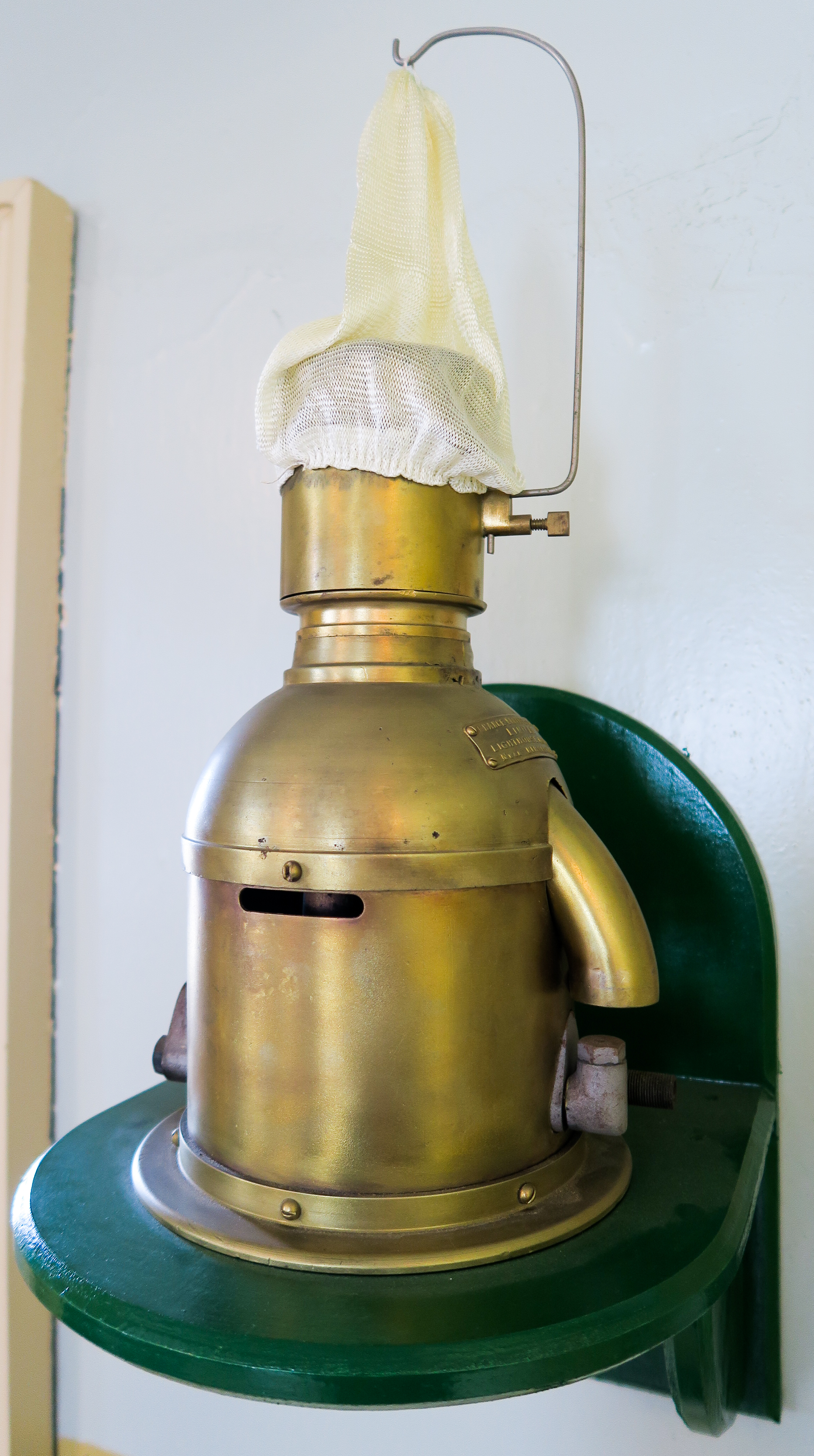
An 85 mm Chance Brothers Incandescent Petroleum Vapour Installation

The mantle is a roughly pear-shaped fabric bag, made from silk, ramie-based artificial silk, or rayon. The fibers are impregnated with metallic salts; when the mantle is first heated in a flame, the fibers burn away in seconds and the metallic salts convert to solid oxides, forming a brittle ceramic oxide shell in the shape of the original fabric. A mantle glows brightly in the visible spectrum while emitting little infrared radiation. The rare-earth (cerium) and actinide (thorium) oxides in the mantle have a low emissivity in the infrared (in comparison with an ideal black body) but have high emissivity in the visible spectrum. There is also some evidence that the emission is enhanced by candoluminescence, the emission of light from the combustion products before they reach thermal equilibrium. The combination of these properties yields a mantle that, when heated by a kerosene or liquified petroleum gas flame, emits intense radiation that is mostly visible light, with relatively little energy in the unwanted infrared, increasing the luminous efficiency.

The mantle aids the combustion process by keeping the flame small and contained at higher fuel flow rates than in a simple lamp. Concentrating combustion inside the mantle improves the transfer of heat from the flame to the mantle.

== History ==
For centuries, artificial light has been generated using open flames. Limelight was invented in the 1820s, but the temperature required to produce visible light through black-body radiation alone was too high to be practical for small lights. In the late 19th century, several inventors tried to develop an effective alternative based on heating a material to a lower temperature but using the emission of discrete spectral lines to simulate white light.

Many early attempts used platinum-iridium gauze soaked in metal nitrates, but these were not successful because of the high cost of these materials and their poor reliability. The first effective mantle was the Clamond basket in 1881, named after its inventor. This device was made from a matrix of magnesium oxide, which did not need to be supported by a platinum wire cage, and was exhibited in the Crystal Palace exhibition of 1883.

The modern gas mantle was one of the many inventions of Carl Auer von Welsbach, a chemist who studied rare-earth elements in the 1880s and who had been Robert Bunsen's student. Ignaz Kreidl worked with him on his early experiments to create the Welsbach mantle. His first process used a mixture of 60% magnesium oxide, 20% lanthanum oxide and 20% yttrium oxide, which he called "Actinophor" and patented in 1887 (March 15, 1887, US patent #359,524). These original mantles gave off a green-tinted light and were not very successful. Welsbach's first company established a factory in Atzgersdorf in 1887, but it failed in 1889. In 1889, Welsbach received his first patent mentioning thorium (March 5, 1889, US patent #399,174). In 1891 he perfected a new mixture of 99% thorium dioxide and 1% cerium dioxide that gave off a much whiter light and produced a stronger mantle. After introducing this new mantle commercially in 1892, it quickly spread throughout Europe. The gas mantle remained an important part of street lighting until the widespread introduction of electric lighting in the early 1900s.

== Production ==
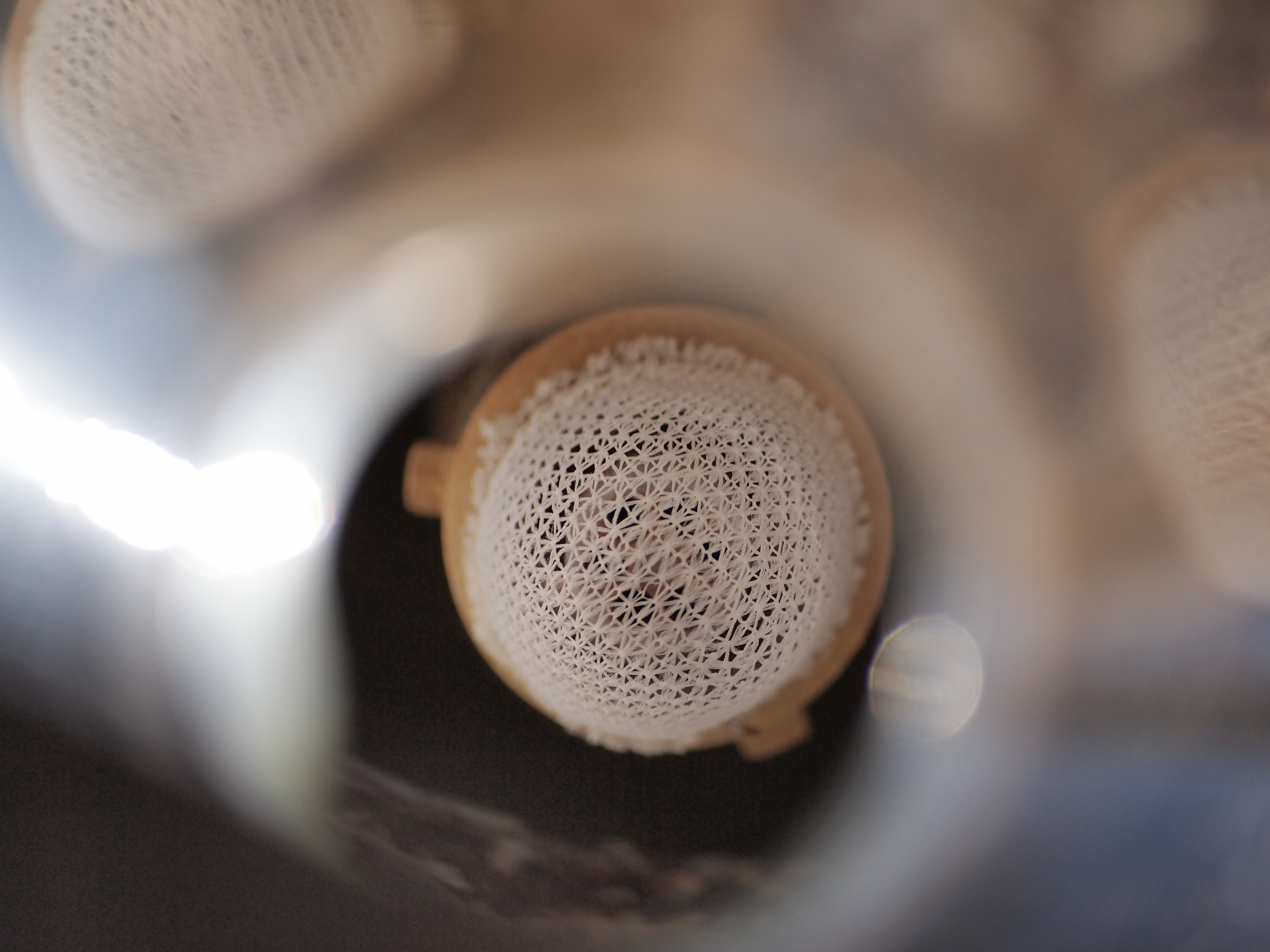
Gas mantle in a street lamp (cold)

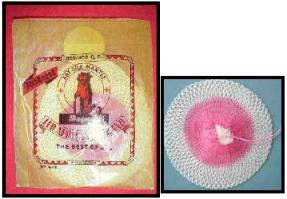
Mantles in their unused flat-packed form

To produce a mantle, cotton is woven or knit into a net bag, impregnated with soluble nitrates of the chosen metals, and then transported to its destination. The user installs the mantle and then burns it to remove the cotton bag and convert the metal nitrates to nitrites which fuse together to form a solid mesh. As the heating continues, the nitrites finally decompose into a fragile mesh of solid oxides with very high melting points.

Early mantles were sold in the unheated cotton mesh condition, since the post heating oxide structure was too fragile to transport easily. The mantle converts to its working form when the cotton burns away on first use. Originally, unused mantles could not be stored for very long because the cotton quickly rotted due to the corrosive nature of the acidic metal nitrates. The acidic metal corrosion was later addressed by soaking the mantle in an ammonia solution to neutralize the excess acid.

Later mantles were made from guncotton (nitrocellulose) which can be produced with extremely fine threads when compared with ordinary cotton threads. These had to be converted back to cellulose by immersion in ammonium sulfide before first use as guncotton is highly flammable and can be explosive. Later, it was discovered that a cotton mantle could be strengthened sufficiently by dipping it in a solution of collodion to coat it with a thin layer that would be burned off when the mantle was first used.

Mantles have a binding thread to tie them to the lamp fitting. Until asbestos was banned due to its carcinogenicity, an asbestos thread was used. Modern mantles use a wire or a ceramic fiber thread.

== Safety concerns ==
Thorium is radioactive and produces the radioactive gas radon-220 as one of its decay products. Moreover, when heated to incandescence, the thorium volatilizes its in-growth radio-daughters, particularly radium-224. Despite its very short half-life, radium quickly replenishes from its radio-parent (thorium-228), and every new heating of the mantle to incandescence releases a fresh flush of radium-224 into the air. This byproduct can be inhaled if the mantle is used indoors, and is an internal alpha-emitter radio-toxicity concern. Secondary decay products of thorium include radium and actinium. Because of this, there are concerns about the safety of thorium mantles. The Australian Radiation Protection and Nuclear Safety Agency recommends mantles made with yttrium instead.

A study in 1981 estimated that the dose from using a thorium mantle every weekend for a year would be 3–6 microsieverts (0.3–0.6 mrem), tiny in comparison to the normal annual background radiation dose of around 2.4 mSv (240 mrem), although this assumes the thorium remains intact rather than airborne. A person actually ingesting a mantle would receive a dose of 2 mSv (200 mrem). However, the radioactivity is a major concern for people involved with the manufacture of mantles and an issue with contamination of soil around some former factory sites.

One potential cause for concern is that particles from thorium gas mantles "fall out" over time and get into the air, where they may be ingested in food or drink. These particles may also be inhaled and remain in the lungs or liver, causing long-term exposure exceeding the risk of background radiation. Also of concern is the release of thorium-bearing dust if the mantle shatters due to mechanical impact.

All of these issues have led to the use of alternatives in some countries, usually yttrium or sometimes zirconium, although these are usually either more expensive or less efficient. Safety concerns were the subject of a federal suit against the Coleman Company (Wagner v. Coleman), which initially agreed to place warning labels on the mantles for this concern, and subsequently switched to using yttrium.

In June 2001, the U.S. Nuclear Regulatory Commission published a study about the Systematic Radiological Assessment of Exemptions for Source and Byproduct Materials, stating that radioactive gas mantles are explicitly legal in the US.

== See also ==
- Candoluminescence – Type of luminescence
- Clamond basket – Kind of gas mantle
- Coleman lantern – Series of pressure lamps
- Gas lighting – Types of lighting device which burn gas fuel
- Kerosene lamp – Type of lighting device that uses kerosene as a fuel
- Thermoluminescence – Light from the re-emission of absorbed energy when a substance is heated
