= Coleman (brand) =

Brand of outdoor recreation products

The Coleman Company, Inc.
- Type: Subsidiary
- Industry: Outdoor recreation
- Founded: 1900; 126 years ago
- Founder: William Coffin Coleman
- Headquarters: Chicago, Illinois, U.S.
- Key people: Jim Pisani (CEO)
- Products: Camping equipment
- Number of employees: 4,000 (est.)
- Parent: Newell Brands
- Subsidiaries: Esky (under Coleman Australia)
- Website: www.coleman.com

The Coleman Company, Inc., is an American manufacturer of outdoor recreation products, best known for its camping gear including lanterns, portable stoves, sleeping bags, chairs, and coolers. Founded in 1902 and currently headquartered in Chicago, the company employs approximately 4,000 people. Coleman is now a subsidiary of Newell Brands and has a facility in Wichita, Kansas. The facility in New Braunfels, Texas, was closed in 2022.

== History ==
The company was founded by William Coffin Coleman, who began selling gasoline pressure lamps in 1902 in Wichita. In 1905, the company provided a demonstration for the 1905 Cooper vs. Fairmount football game (now Sterling College and Wichita State University).

By the 1910s, Coleman lanterns were being distributed by the U.S. government to support agricultural production during World War I. In World War II, the company developed the Model 520, a compact, multi-fuel burner designed for military use.

Throughout the mid-20th century, Coleman expanded into various home and utility products. By the 1990s, the company refocused on its core outdoor recreation offers.

Coleman gas lamps were provided to play the first night football game west of the Mississippi River. In 1996, the company acquired Campingaz, a French company.

In September 2004, Jarden acquired American Household, which was the privately held parent company of Coleman as well as other brands like Sunbeam Products, for $745.6 million in cash.

In December 2015, Newell Brands acquired the Coleman brand through the acquisition of Jarden for $13.2 billion.

== Products ==
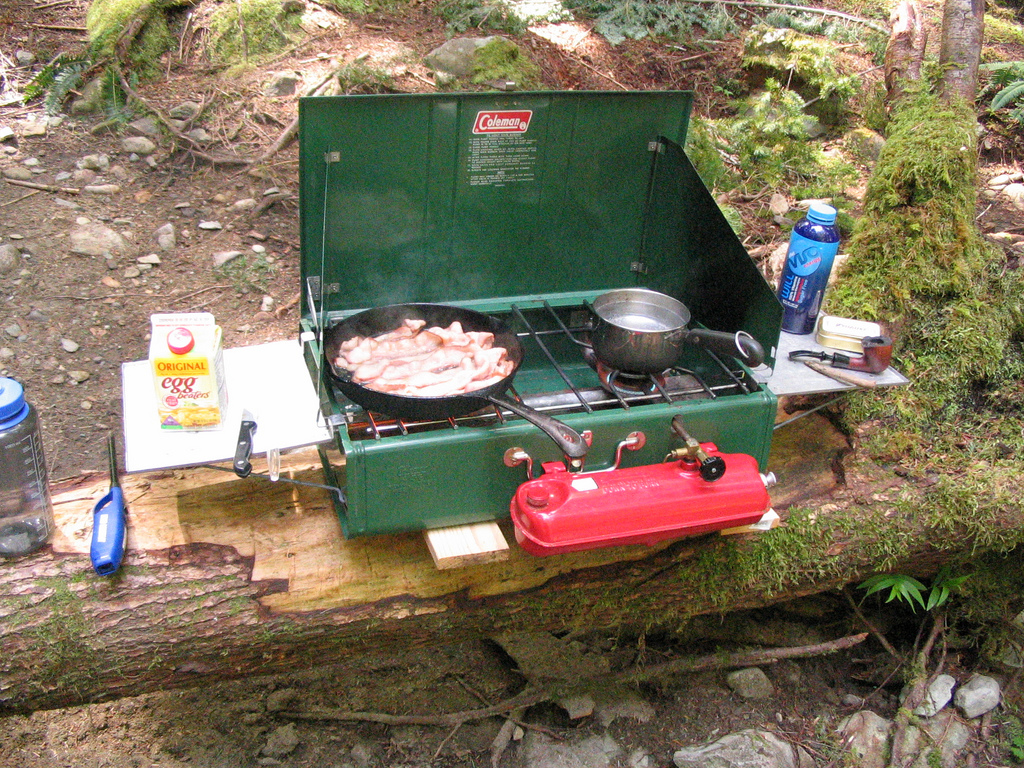
Coleman gas camp stove

Throughout its history, Coleman has produced a wide variety of equipment primarily aimed at the camping and recreational markets. The Coleman Lantern is a series of pressure lamps that were originally made to burn gasoline. Current models use Coleman fuel (white gas) or propane and use one or two gas mantles to produce an intense white light.

In the past, the company also produced a range of cooking stoves and domestic irons. Today, Coleman manufactures camp stoves (Coleman produced the original "G.I. Pocket Stove"), sleeping bags, coolers, hot tubs, generators, watches, sandals, tents, dog toys, and backpacks, among other things. They also make a line of small boats, including canoes, pontoon boats, and johnboats. In the past they sold pop-up travel trailers, Skiroule snowmobiles and the Hobie Cat brand of sailboats. The company produces backyard barbecue grills, sold at Canadian Tire.

A separate company, Coleman Heating and Air Conditioning, sells home heating and air conditioning units. Coleman Heating and Air Conditioning is owned by Johnson Controls, and uses the Coleman name and logo under license.

Coleman also produces ATVs and minibikes under the Coleman Powersports brand.
