= Coleman Lantern =

Series of pressure lamps

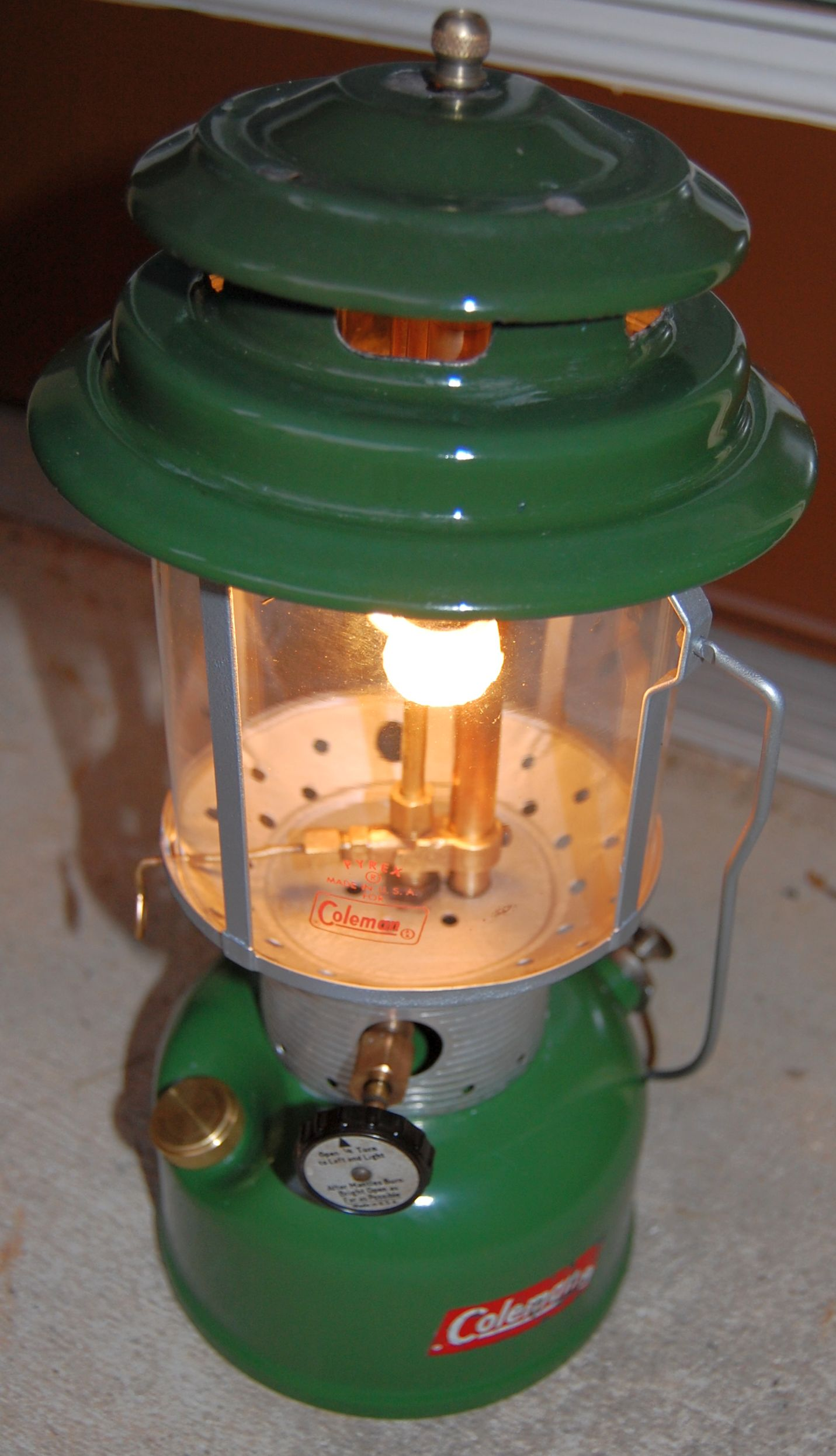
- A lit Coleman model 220F lantern
- Inventor: William Coffin Coleman
- Inception: 1914
- Manufacturer: Coleman Company
- Current supplier: Coleman Company

The Coleman Lantern is a line of pressure lamps first introduced by the Coleman Company in 1914. This led to a series of lamps that were originally made to burn kerosene or gasoline. Current models use kerosene, gasoline, Coleman fuel (white gas) or propane and use one or two mantles to produce an intense white light. Over the years more than 50 million of the lanterns have been sold throughout the world.

== History ==
In 1900, William Coffin Coleman was selling high pressure gasoline fueled lamps. These lamps, notably 'The Efficient' Pendant Arc lamp No. 6, were manufactured by Irby & Gilliland in Memphis, Tennessee. However, poor sales led him to acquire the patent for the lamp and redesign it. He began to produce the lamp in 1903, and in 1914 he introduced the Coleman Lantern, a design incorporating various improvements, such as bug-screen and flat base.
