= Newell Custom Writing Instruments =

American manufacturer of pens and markers

- Formerly: Sanford Manufacturing Co. (1857–); Sanford L.P.; Sanford B2B
- Type: Subsidiary
- Industry: Writing implements
- Founded: 1857; 169 years ago
- Founder: Frederick W. Redington; William H. Sanford
- Headquarters: Atlanta, Georgia, US
- Area served: Worldwide
- Brands: Sharpie; Paper Mate; Expo; Parker; Waterman
- Parent: Newell Brands (1992-present)
- Website: newellcustom.com

Newell Custom Writing Instruments (formerly Sanford Business-to-Business, abbreviated Sanford B2B) is an American manufacturing company of stationery products. It is a division of Newell Brands, producing writing implements, in its plant of Atlanta, Georgia.

Brands currently commercialized by the company are Sharpie, Paper Mate, Expo, Parker, and Waterman.

The company operates worldwide, with locations in Australia, Canada, Colombia, Germany, Mexico, France, the United Kingdom, United States and Venezuela.

== History ==
The company was founded in 1857 by Frederick W. Redington and William H. Sanford, Jr. in Massachusetts as the "Sanford Manufacturing Company". The company moved to Chicago in 1866, five years before the Great Chicago Fire destroyed Sanford's Chicago location. New facilities were soon built after the devastation of the fire, and operations resumed. In 1947, following World War II, the Sanford Ink Company was forced to move locations to make room for a new expressway. The company settled in Bellwood, Illinois, where it still maintains a facility. In August 1985, Sanford became a public company. On February 14, 1992, Sanford was acquired by the Newell Company (now called Newell Brands, a Fortune 500 company).

In August 1976, the company launched the first Expo dry erase marker. In November 1986, the company launched a new marker named Expo II. It featured an alcohol-based ink instead of methyl isobutyl ketone. Sanford discontinued the Expo 2 in the 2010s and switched the line to the alcohol-based ink.

Former Sanford logo, used until 2019

Business grew through many acquisitions. Newell already owned Keene Office Products and Rogers Office Products, acquired in 1991. In 1994, they acquired Eberhard Faber, in 1995 Berol and Phillips, and in 1998, Rotring, a German technical drawing instruments company. Also in 1998, Sanford split into two divisions: Sanford North America and Sanford International. In 1999, Rubbermaid, Little Tikes, Graco, and Curver were acquired and the company changed its name to "Newell Rubbermaid".

In 2000, Gillette (now part of Procter & Gamble) sold its writing instruments division to Newell Rubbermaid, whose own stationery division, Sanford, became Sanford, L.P. (later renamed "Newell Rubbermaid Office Products"). Gillette had acquired Parker Pens in 1993 and had already owned the Paper Mate brand, as well as Waterman, and Liquid Paper.

In 2019, Sanford B2B changed its name to "Newell Custom Writing Instruments".

== Products ==
Newell Custom manufactures a large variety of products through its brands, those include:

Brand	Products
Sharpie	Markers, highlighters
Paper Mate	Ballpoint pens, gel pens, markers
Expo	Markers
Parker	Fountain pens, ballpoint pens, fountain pen inks
Waterman	Fountain pens

== Former brands ==
The following brands were part of the Sanford Company, then taken over by Newell Brands:

- Berol
- CardScan
- Dymo
- Liquid Paper
- Mimio
- Mr. Sketch
- Pelouze
- Prismacolor
- Reynolds
- Rolodex
- Rotring
- Laurentien
