= Newell Brands =

American consumer products company

Newell Brands Inc.
- Formerly: Newell Company (1903–1999); Newell Rubbermaid (1999–2016)
- Type: Public
- Traded as: Nasdaq: NWL; S&P 600 component
- Industry: Consumer goods
- Founded: 1903; 123 years ago, in Ogdensburg, New York, U.S.
- Founder: Edgar Newell
- Headquarters: Sandy Springs, Georgia, U.S.
- Area served: Worldwide
- Key people: Robert Steele (chairman); Chris Peterson (CEO)
- Products: Stationery; Writing implements; Baby products; Fragrances; Outdoor recreation; Home appliances; Food storage containers
- Brands: List: Rubbermaid; Dymo; Elmer's; Mr. Sketch; Paper Mate; Parker; Prismacolor; Rotring; Sharpie; Waterman; X-Acto; Aprica; Baby Jogger; Graco; NUK; Tigex; Aerobed; Bubba; Campingaz; Coleman; Contigo; Marmot; Stearns; Chesapeake Bay Candle; WoodWick; Yankee Candle; BRK; First Alert; One Link; Calphalon; Mapa Professional; Crock-Pot; Mr. Coffee; Oster; Sunbeam; Ball; Kerr; Food Saver; Sistema
- Revenue: ▼US$8.13 billion (2023)
- Operating income: ▼US$−85 million (2023)
- Net income: ▼US$−388 million (2023)
- Total assets: ▼US$12.2 billion (2023)
- Total equity: ▼US$3.11 billion (2023)
- Owners: Pzena Investment Management (11.4%); Icahn Capital (8%)
- Number of employees: c. 24,600 (2023)
- Divisions: Newell Custom Writing; Rubbermaid Commercial Products
- Website: newellbrands.com

Newell Brands Inc. is an American conglomerate of consumer and commercial products. The company's brands and products include Rubbermaid storage/or waste disposal containers; home organization and reusable container products; Contigo and Bubba water bottles; Coleman outdoor products; writing instruments (Berol, Expo Markers, Paper Mate, Dymo, Mr. Sketch, Parker Pens, Sharpie, Reynolds, Prismacolor, Rotring, X-acto, Waterman) glue (Elmer's, Krazy Glue); children's products (Aprica, NUK, Tigex, Babysun, Baby Jogger and Graco); cookware and small appliances (Calphalon, Sunbeam, Rival, Crock-Pot; Holmes, FoodSaver, Oster, Osterizer, and Mr. Coffee) and fragrance products (Yankee Candle, Chesapeake Bay Candle, Millefiori Milano, and WoodWick).

The company's global headquarters is in Atlanta.

== History ==
First Newell logo

The Newell Manufacturing Company was founded by Edgar Newell in Ogdensburg, New York, in 1903 as a manufacturer of metal curtain rods.

The F. W. Woolworth retail chain became the first customer for Newell's bronze–plated curtain rods in 1916, making them the first Newell products to be distributed nationally. This marked the beginning of Newell's mass merchandising strategy. As the business grew, the company built a new 15,000-square-foot facility in Ogdensburg, New York.

The company purchased Barnwell Mfg. Co. of Freeport, Illinois in 1921, renaming it Western Newell Manufacturing Company. Freeport's access to railroad lines facilitated shipping products west. Kresge, the department store chain (later Kmart) was one of Western Newell's larger accounts.

Daniel C. Ferguson was named president in 1965 and developed a growth-by-acquisition strategy, intending to build a strong, multi-product company.

The Newell Company went public in 1972, opening on the NASDAQ, (a then-recently established stock exchange) at $28 per share. In 1974, they acquired EZ Paintr Corporation, then the world's largest maker of paint applicators. Newell was listed on the New York Stock Exchange with the ticker symbol NWL in 1979. In 1979, Newell moved into its first corporate headquarters in a historic former bank building in Freeport, Illinois.

In 1983, the company entered the cookware market with the purchase of Mirro. In 1985, William P. Sovey was announced as the new president. Daniel C. Ferguson continued as vice chairman and chief executive officer of the company. In 1987, the company acquired Anchor Hocking Corporation, a specialty manufacturer of glassware, flatware, cookware and other products. The deal included the purchase of Amerock, a maker of cabinet hardware and window components.

In 1992, they acquired Sanford, a manufacturer and marketer of writing instruments, including the Sharpie and Expo brands. A year later, they acquired Levolor, a manufacturer and marketer of window treatments. They entered the beauty and style category by acquiring Goody hair care brushes ad accessories, including Ace men's grooming accessories. They also acquired Stuart Hall, a Kansas City stationery company, which they held until 1998.

In 1997, Newell acquired Cooper Industries' Kirsch, a company specializing in drapery hardware, and custom window coverings. In 1998, the company expanded in cookware with the purchase of Calphalon Corporation, a manufacturer of cookware marketed primarily to upscale retailers and department stores. The company also purchased Panex, a cookware maker in South America.

In 2016, Newell transferred its corporate headquarters to Hoboken, New Jersey. Three years later, it returned to Atlanta.

In 2018, Newell Brands sold Pure Fishing to New York-based private equity firm, Sycamore Partners, for approximately US$1.3 billion.

== Criticism ==
Newell Rubbermaid has been criticized in the UK for closing British factories, including those of Parker Pen, and relocating them to Nantes, France, and China. Similarly, they have been criticized for their handling of Toolmakers Berol, Record and Marples.

Newell Sistema products has been criticized for requiring workers in their Auckland, New Zealand, factory to work in unsafe conditions during the COVID-19 outbreak and lock down without adequate distances between workers and proper personal protective equipment. After a WorkSafe NZ visit, workers were told they would not have to go to work and would be on full pay for the four-week lock down.

== Mergers ==
=== Rubbermaid ===
Newell Rubbermaid logo used from 1999 to 2016

In 1999, Newell acquired the Rubbermaid and Graco brand names in a megamerger worth $5.8 billion, renaming the combined firm Newell Rubbermaid. This was an acquisition ten times larger than the last biggest acquisition Newell had made, nearly doubled the company's size, and significantly increased Newell's portfolio of brands.

In 2003, the merger was dubbed the "merger from hell" by Businessweek magazine. Newell shareholders lost 50% of their value in the two years following the closing and Rubbermaid shareholders lost 35%. In 2002, Newell wrote off $500 million in goodwill.

=== Other mergers ===
In 2000, Newell Rubbermaid acquired Gillette's stationery products business, including the Paper Mate, Parker, Waterman and Liquid Paper brands.

In 2002, they acquired American Tool Companies, adding the Irwin, Vise-Grip, and Marathon brands to their portfolio.

In 2003, Newell Rubbermaid acquired American Saw and Manufacturing Company, a manufacturer of linear-edge power tool accessories, hand tools, and band saw blades marketed under the Lenox brand.

In 2005, the company acquired DYMO, designing, manufacturing, and marketing on-demand labeling solutions. The company expanded its presence in this market with the 2006 purchases of CardScan business card scanners and Mimio interactive whiteboard products along with the 2007 acquisition of postage company Endicia and its Picture-it-Postage brand. In 2005, Mark Ketchum was named president and CEO. The company added the slogan of "Brands That Matter" to their logo to emphasize the change.

In February 2008, Newell Rubbermaid acquired Aprica Kassai, a Japanese maker of strollers, car seats, and other children's products. The company created a global headquarters in the Atlanta metropolitan area to consolidate numerous brands and functions under one roof. In July 2011, Michael B. Polk joined the company as president and CEO.

On July 21, 2014, Newell Rubbermaid announced a $308 million acquisition of Ignite Holdings, a Chicago-based maker of reusable water bottles and thermal mugs. Ignite sold its products under two brand names: Avex and Contigo, also acquiring Ignite's proprietary closing mechanism, Autoseal.

On October 5, 2015, Newell Rubbermaid announced that it would acquire Elmer's Products, the makers of Elmer's glue, Krazy Glue, and X-Acto, among other brands, for $600 million. The company also announced plans to divest its window covering brands Levolor and Kirsch.

On December 14, 2015, Newell Rubbermaid announced that it would acquire Jarden for over $15 billion of cash and stock. The combined company would be known as Newell Brands, and 55% would be owned by Newell's shareholders. The combined company would have estimated annual sales of $16 billion.

=== Divestitures ===
In 2014 Newell Rubbermaid sold Ashland Hardware Systems, Bulldog and Shurline.

In 2017, Newell sold K2 Sports, Völkl, Diamond Match Company, Levolor and Kirsch.

In January 2018, Newell announced that it would sell off several businesses, mostly former Jarden units, in a refocusing effort. In May 2018, Newell sold Waddington to Novolex. In June 2018, Newell sold Rawlings to Seidler Equity Partners. In August 2018, Newell sold Goody to ACON Investments. In November 2018, Newell sold its Pure Fishing line of business to Sycamore Partners for $1.3 billion and Jostens to Platinum Equity for $1.3 billion.

In June 2019, Newell Brands announced the sale of the United States Playing Card Company to Belgian card manufacturer Cartamundi Group.

== Brands ==
Newell's brands include the following.

=== Home appliances ===
- Breville (Note: In the UK and Europe only, brand owned by Breville Group elsewhere)
- Calphalon
- Crock-Pot
- Mr. Coffee
- Oster
- Sunbeam (Note: As of 2022, the Sunbeam brand is focused almost entirely on health and thermal pain relief products, as well as clothes irons.)
- Cadence

=== Baby and health ===
- Aprica Kassai
- Baby Jogger
- Graco
- NUK
- Century
- Tigex
- Lillo
- Billy Boy (condoms)

=== Commercial solutions ===
- Quickie
- Rubbermaid Commercial Products
- Spontex
- MAPA

=== Food ===
- Ball & Kerr
- Food Saver
- Rubbermaid
- Sistema Plastics

=== Home fragrance ===
- Chesapeake Bay Candle
- WoodWick
- Yankee Candle
- Millefiori Milano

=== Outdoor and recreation ===
- Aerobed
- Avex
- Bubba
- Campingaz
- Coleman
- Contigo
- Esky
- Exofficio
- Mad Dog
- Marmot
- Sevylor
- Stearns

=== Writing (stationery) ===
- Dymo
- Elmer's
- Liquid paper
- Mr. Sketch
- Paper Mate
- Parker
- Prismacolor
- Reynolds Pen
- Rotring
- Expo
- Sharpie
- Waterman pens
- X-Acto
- Berol

=== Former brands ===
- Ashland Hardware
- Amerock
- Bulldog Hardware
- Bicycle (Note: sold to Cartamundi in 2019.)
- Diamond Match Company
- Goody (Note: sold to ACON Investments, LLC. in 2018.)
- Irwin (Note: Newell Brands tool brands were sold to Stanley Black & Decker in 2016 for $1.95 billion.)
- Jostens
- K2
- Little Tikes (Note: sold to MGA Entertainment in 2006.)
- Marker
- Pure Fishing
- Rawlings
- Shurline
- Völkl
- Waddington
- Seal-a-Meal
- GrillMaster
- Health o Meter
- Margaritaville
- Rival
- VillaWare
- White Mountain Products
- Fiona
- Lillo
- Bernardin
- Tableluxe
- Luma Home
- Calypso
- Crawford
- Lehigh
- Mucambo Professional
- Virulana
- Vitomit
- Y-O-U
- Rexair
- Jarden
- Lifoam
- First Alert
- BRK Electronics
- OneLink
