= TechniGraphics =

TechniGraphics, Inc.
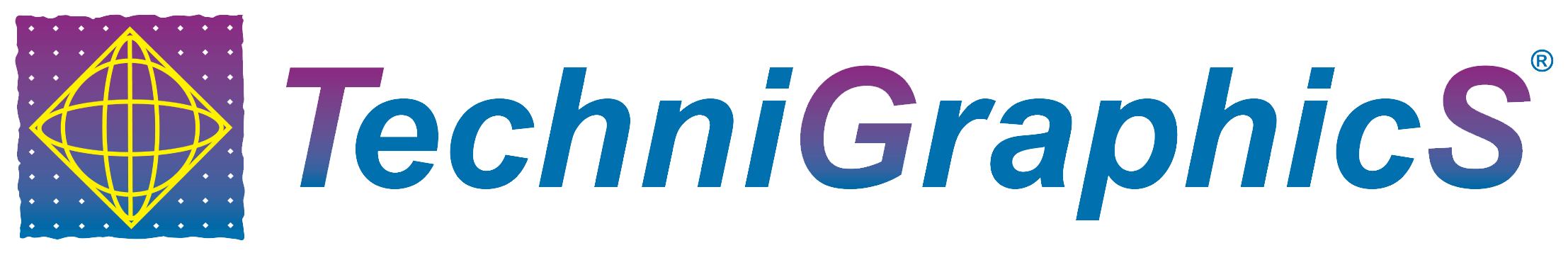
- Formerly: Technicolor Graphic Services
- Company type: Division
- Industry: Visual Information Systems; Geospatial Services
- Founded: 1993
- Headquarters: Wooster, Ohio, United States
- Revenue: 46,000,000 United States dollar (2010)
- Number of employees: 450 (2010)
- Parent: CACI
- Website: www.tgstech.com

TechniGraphics, Inc. was a multi-national company with its headquarters in Wooster, Ohio, USA. It was involved in geospatial and engineering services. In November 2010, the company was acquired by CACI International Inc.

== History ==
TechniGraphics started out as Technicolor Graphic Services (TGS), a division of the "Color by Technicolor" company. The company began working with early GIS systems like GRASS and MOSS in 1982, progressing with the maturing industry to ESRI's ArcInfo in 1989, and most recently to the object-based GIS embodied in ArcGIS 9.0. The company abbreviated its name to TechniGraphics, Inc. in 2005.

The company was acquired by Dee and Mary Vaidya in 1993 and turned around with the help of the former Rubbermaid CEO, Donald E. Noble, who became a shareholder when he purchased the shares of an earlier partner of the Vaidya's. The Fort Collins, Colorado, company was a federal contractor and produced digital maps for the United States Geological Survey and the Defense Mapping Agency.

In 2002, to win additional volume of work for the same kind of digital maps it had produced since inception, TechniGraphics again applied to be a prime contractor, this time to the United States Department of Defense, and in 2003 was awarded a 10-year, $200 million Prime Contract that led to explosive growth for the organization.

In 2006, the company purchased the $10 million per year Product Lifecycle Management business of MSC Software and another $5 million per year company, Axiom Systems. These purchases added six offices, almost 100 people and expanded the company into Europe. TechniGraphics acquired another similar company, CUTit, in Germany in 2007, which firmly established it in the engineering services field.

In 2010, TechniGraphics' Geospatial activity was purchased by CACI. The engineering services activity was spun off to form a new company, Noble Technologies, d.b.a NobleTek.

On May 21, 2013, CACI closed its operations in Wooster.

=== Locations ===
- Fort Collins, Colorado
- St. Louis, Missouri
