= Sistema Plastics =

New Zealand plastic manufacturer

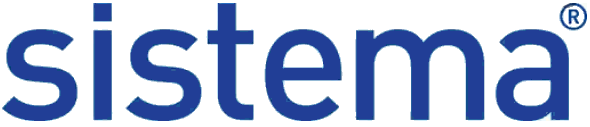
- Type: Subsidiary
- Industry: Food
- Founded: 1987; 39 years ago
- Founder: Sir Brendan Lindsay
- Headquarters: Auckland, New Zealand
- Products: Plastic food containers
- Parent: Newell Brands
- Website: sistemaplastics.com

Sistema Plastics is a New Zealand company which manufactures food storage containers. It is based in Auckland and owned by Newell Brands.

== History ==
Brendan Lindsay founded Sistema Plastics from his home in Cambridge, New Zealand in 1987. The company name Sistema comes from the Italian word for system. The company is focused on BPA-free plastic kitchen storage containers under the brand names KLIP IT and Klipo.

Newell Brands bought the company in 2017 for NZ$660 million (US$470 million).

In November 2024, Sistema Plastics confirmed that it would lay off about 100 workers at its Auckland factory by Christmas 2024.

== Awards ==
In 2018, Sistema was named Plastics Training Company of the Year by the New Zealand Plastics Industry. In 2019, Sistema won the Technology Innovator award in the Epicor Customer Excellence Global Awards programme, for its use of automated processes.
