= Igloo Products =

American manufacturing company

Igloo Products Corp.
- Type: Subsidiary of Dometic Group
- Industry: Coolers
- Founded: 1947
- Headquarters: Katy, Waller County, Texas, United States
- Number of employees: 1200
- Website: www.igloocoolers.com

Igloo Products Corp. is an American manufacturer of ice chests, drink containers, and supporting accessories. It is headquartered in Katy, Waller County, Texas, United States. Igloo is a subsidiary of the Dometic Group. The company was founded in 1947 in Katy and is known for its blue and white coolers. Igloo's product line includes a wide range of coolers and ice chests for various uses, from small personal coolers to large commercial coolers, as well as beverage dispensers, marine coolers, and accessories.

== History ==
Igloo began in 1947 as a metalworking shop that produced metal water coolers for blue-collar workers. In early 1960, Igloo merged with the Production Tooling Company, and the company name changed to Texas Tennessee Industries (TTI). The company's marketing arm was the John T. Everett Company, a company from Memphis, Tennessee.

By 1971, TTI was planning to change its name to Igloo.

The company's first all-plastic ice chest was introduced in 1962 by James F. Hutchison. Igloo makes the coolers for personal and industrial use and claims that nearly three in every four US households own an Igloo cooler. The company's more than 500 products (including personal, beverage, and full-sized coolers) are sold through thousands of retailers in the US and abroad.

Private investment firm Westar Capital purchased Igloo from Brunswick in 2001. J.H. Whitney & Company became the new majority owner in 2008. In March 2014, ACON Investments, a Washington, DC–based private equity firm, purchased Igloo from J.H. Whitney, which will maintain a small stake in the company.

In September 2021, Dometic Group, a Swedish company that manufactures a variety of products, notably in the recreational vehicle market, purchased Igloo from ACON Investments for $677 million.

== Corporate affairs ==
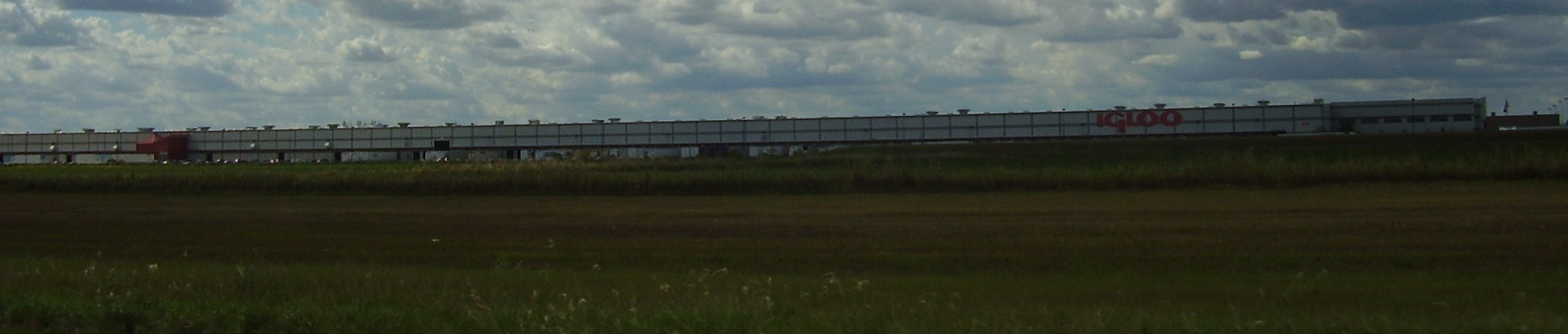
Main Igloo production facility in Waller County, Texas

The company's headquarters are in unincorporated Waller County, Texas, United States, west of the city of Katy. The complex has almost 1,400,000 square feet (130,000 m^{2}) of space on a 105-acre (42 ha) plot. The company announced that it was consolidating its corporate headquarters and distribution and manufacturing offices in its current headquarters location. The newest buildings of the headquarters complex, built adjacent to an existing Igloo 500,000 square feet (46,000 m^{2}) distribution and manufacturing facility used for over 25 years, include a 87,000-square-foot (8,100 m^{2}) corporate office and a 805,000 square feet (74,800 m^{2}) distribution and manufacturing facility. The two newer buildings were designed by Powers Brown Architecture and built by D.E. Harvey Construction.

During the 1980s, Igloo had its headquarters in Houston.

Prior to 2004, Igloo's manufacturing facilities included the one in Katy and one along Beltway 8 in Spring Branch. The Spring Branch location also housed the company headquarters. In 2004, Igloo announced that it was consolidating its operations to its Katy complex.
