= Laurentien (art supplies) =

Canadian brand of art supplies

Laurentien (originally Laurentian) was a Canadian brand of art supplies owned by Sanford Canada. The line of supplies included coloured pencils, markers and crayons. The line of Laurentian coloured pencils was discontinued in 2012 and their websites no longer exist. Laurentien was marketed in the United States under the name Paradise.

== History ==
Laurentien was originally owned by Venus Pencils and was originally spelled Laurentian. During the 1960s, the packaging of Laurentien's products changed to become a portable vinyl pouch and the colour pencils now had space for labeling on the pencil supposedly to "deter theft from classmates". In 1972, Laurentian's name was changed to Laurentien, supposedly in an attempt to increase sales in Quebec. In 1994, Sanford L.P. acquired Laurentien. In 2001, Sanford L.P. discontinued the vinyl pouch design and used a cardboard box instead. Laurentien's website stated that this was due to consumers being more likely to put the coloured pencils in a pencil case. In 2012, Laurentien ceased the production of its coloured pencils.

== Coloured pencils ==
Laurentien brand coloured pencils are also known as pencil crayons in Canada. Colours produced by Laurentian:

- 1: Deep Yellow
- 2: Orange (originally Sarasota Orange)
- 3: Poppy Red
- 4: Cerise (originally Hollywood Cerise)
- 5: Purple (originally Orchid Purple)
- 6: Navy Blue
- 7: Peacock Blue
- 8: Emerald Green
- 9: Deep Green (originally Deep Chrome Green)
- 10: Brown (originally Photo Brown)
- 11: Chestnut (originally Chestnut Brown)
- 12: Black (originally Midnight Black)
- 13: Ultramarine (originally Ultramarine Blue)
- 14: Soft Peach (originally Natural Flesh)
- 15: Green (originally Lawn Green)
- 16: French Green
- 17: Smoke Grey
- 18: Blush Pink
- 19: Cherry Red
- 20: Arizona Topaz
- 21: Roan Red (originally Indian Red)
- 22: Sky Magenta
- 23: White (originally Cotton White)
- 24: Lemon Yellow
- 25: True Blue
- 26: Brown Sienna (originally Burnt Sienna)
- 27: True Green
- 28: Scarlet
- 29: Lavender
- 30: Light Orange
- 31: Crimson
- 32: Cardinal Red
- 33: Tangerine (originally Sun Orange)
- 34: Cream (replaced Mauve)
- 35: Canary Yellow (replaced Saddle Brown)
- 36: Raspberry
- 37: Grape-Violet (replaced Green)
- 38: Aqua
- 39: Ocean Blue
- 40: Blue
- 41: Blueberry
- 42: Celery
- 43: Peacock Green
- 44: Coffee (replaced Copper)
- 45: Cinnamon
- 46: Tuscan Red
- 47: Pastel Green (replaced Cocoa)
- 48: Dark Brown
- 49: Sienna (replaced Gold)
- 50: Light Yellow (replaced Light Grey)
- 51: Cloud Grey
- 52: Mandarin (replaced Grey)
- 53: Blue Grey
- 54: Dark Grey
- 55: Champagne (replaced Thunder Grey)
- 56: Azure (replaced Light Black)
- 57: Pine Green (replaced Charcoal)
- 58: Turquoise
- 59: True Pink (replaced Silver)
- 60: Khaki

Past colours

- 34: Mauve
- 37: Green
- 44: Copper
- 47: Cocoa
- 49: Gold
- 50: Light Grey
- 52: Grey
- 55: Thunder Grey
- 56: Light Black
- 57: Charcoal
- 59: Silver
- 60: Khaki

Additional metallic colours were also available and appeared in a separate Laurentien Metallic Pencil Crayon Set in 2004. The colours in the metallic set were:

- 61: Metallic Rose
- 62: Metallic Gold
- 66: Metallic Green
- 67: Metallic Blue
- 69: Metallic Purple
- 72: Metallic Silver
