= Campingaz =

Brand of fuel

- Company type: Subsidiary
- Industry: Outdoor recreation
- Founded: 1949; 77 years ago
- Headquarters: France
- Products: Compressed butane/propane, cookers, lanterns, refrigerators and other camping equipment
- Parent: Newell Brands
- Website: campingaz.com

Campingaz, formerly Camping Gaz, is a brand of products with compressed, mixed butane/propane gas supplied in small, lightweight, disposable canisters and larger, refillable cylinders designed for use as a fuel while camping and caravanning. The fuel gas is compressed to a liquid and sold in characteristic blue metal containers. The brand name is also used on appliances manufactured for use with the gas, namely cookers, lanterns, heaters, grills, refrigerators, etc., as well as more general camping equipment, such as sleeping bags.

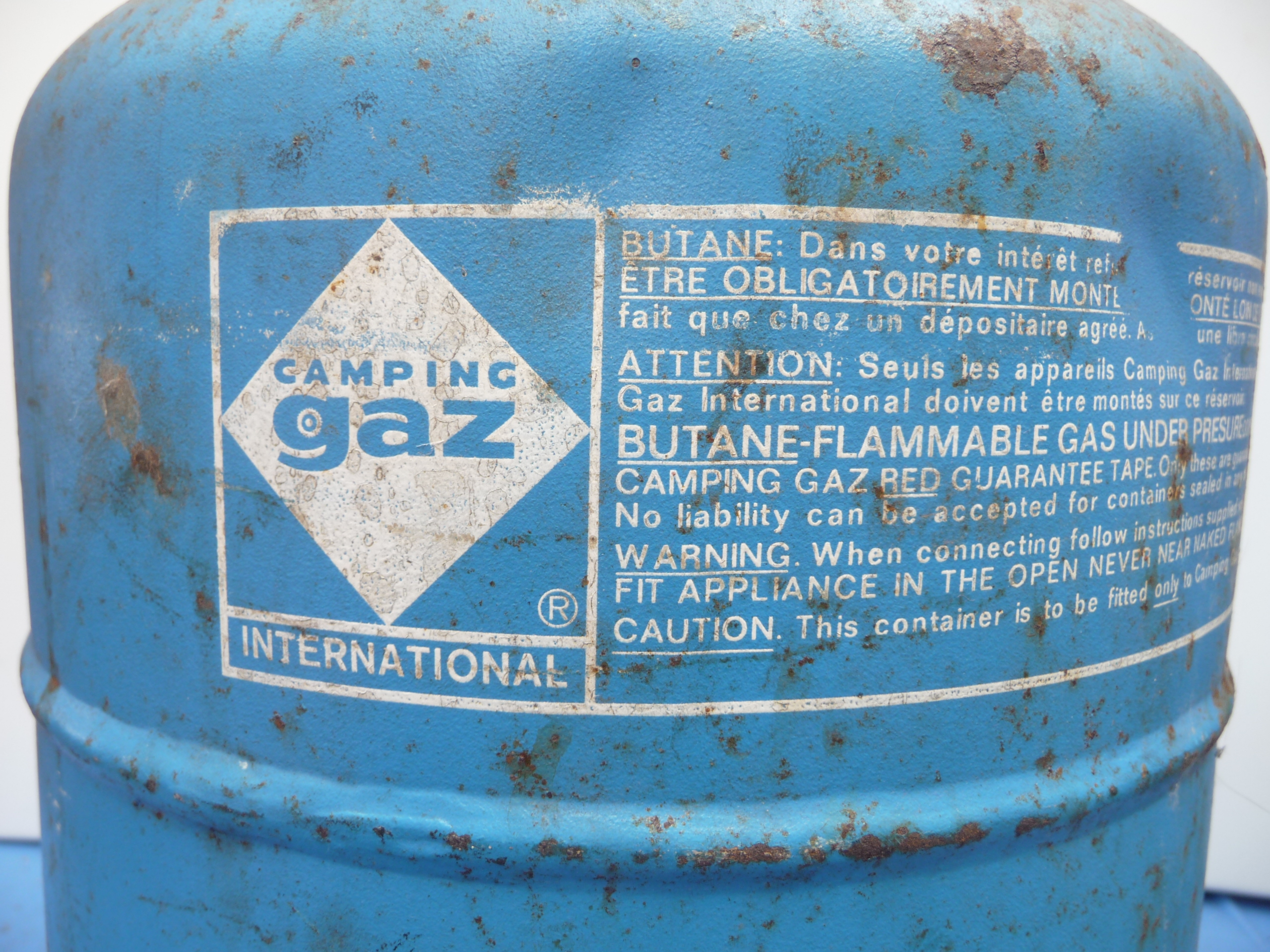
Historic name Camping Gaz on a butane gas bottle

== Company history ==
=== Early history ===
The Camping Gaz company was founded in France in 1949. Introducing a small, blue, refillable gas cylinder, directly fitted with special stoves and Welsbach mantle lanterns, the company rapidly expanded to foreign markets. Starting in 1952, gas lighting and gas burner stoves were offered for campers. The company's first portable stove, named "Bleuet", was released three years later.

=== Late 20th century ===
In 1994, the first range of gas barbecues (the “Ranchero”) was released, becoming one of the first gas barbecue models to be built and sold in Europe. Soft coolers were also added to the company’s portfolio around this time.

In 1996, the company was acquired by the Coleman Company, specialists in outdoor recreation in the United States. In order to expand production capacities, the company moved its barbecue production to the Italian manufacturing facility CGIT in 1997, which produces the majority of thermoelectric and passive hard-shell coolers. A year later, the brand name was changed to Campingaz.

=== Contemporary history ===
In 2005, the company was acquired by Jarden Corporation. Due to the growth of gas grilling in Europe, the Campingaz barbecue range was relaunched in 2014 with new 3 and 4 Series barbecues. Jarden Corporation was acquired by Newell Rubbermaid in April 2016 and Newell Brands was founded. The following year, the company launched its premium gas barbecue collection, the Master Series.

== Sizes and availability ==
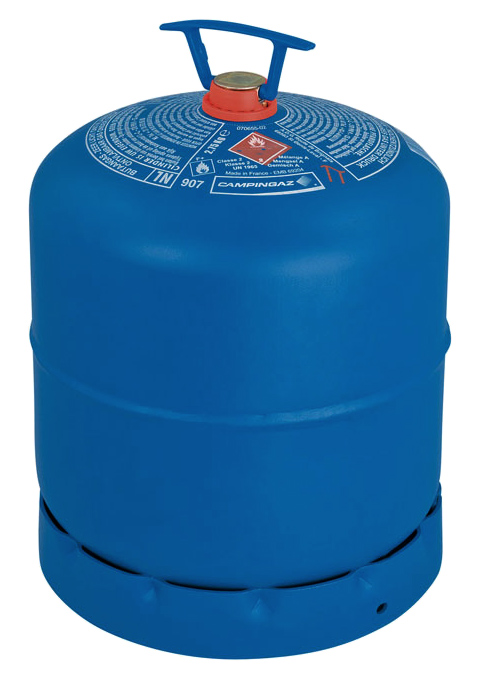
A Campingaz 907 refillable butane/propane gas cylinder

The small disposable gas canisters are constructed of thin metal and typically used in portable camping stoves, small cooking rings and gas lamps. Inserting an original Campingaz canister into the device pierces it and, once the appliance's valve is opened, allows the fuel gas to flow. Pierceable canisters must be completely empty before they are removed from the appliance, otherwise the remaining gas will escape and become a fire hazard. There is also a range of "Plus" self-sealing valve-type canisters, such as the CV 300 Plus, which can be disconnected and reconnected when not empty when they are fitted to compatible devices with the Easy Clic plus connection.

Larger refillable gas cylinders come in three sizes. The 901 cylinder contains 0.454 kilograms (1.00 lb) of gas in a 161 mm (6.3 in) high cylinder with a 110 mm (4.3 in) diameter, the 904 contains 1.81 kg (4.0 lb) in a 188 mm (7.4 in) high cylinder with a 202 mm (8.0 in) diameter, and the 907 (the largest commonly used size) contains 2.72 kg (6.0 lb) in a 250 mm (9.8 in) high cylinder with a 202 mm (8.0 in) diameter. They are self-resealing, so they need not be empty when disconnected. The cylinders are fitted with an M16x1.5 internal screw thread onto which a specific Campingaz pressure regulator is connected (or on recent installations a pigtail hose leading to the regulator). This is followed by the appliance (lamp, cooker burners etc.) attached either by a short rigid pipe or a longer flexible hose. These are typically used for appliances like multi-ring cookers, gas refrigerators, grills or heaters and are frequently used in boats, caravans and motorhomes in Europe.
