= Luma Home =

American Wi-Fi hardware company

Luma Home Inc.
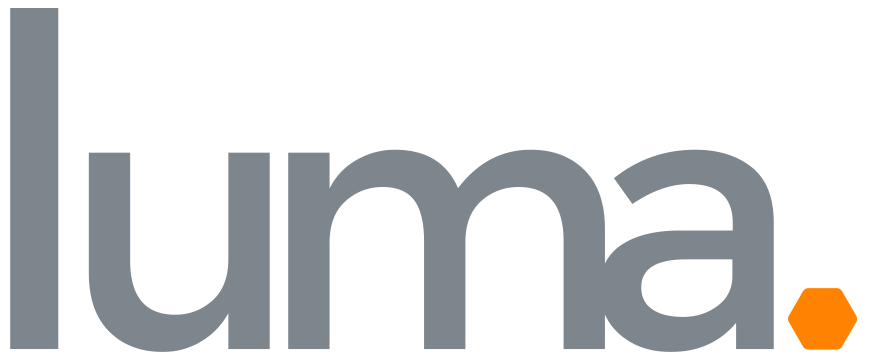
- Type: Subsidiary
- Industry: Technology
- Founded: 2014; 12 years ago
- Founders: Paul Judge; Mike Van Bruinisse
- Headquarters: Atlanta, Georgia, U.S.
- Products: Wireless routers with mesh networking
- Parent: Newell Brands
- Website: lumahome.com

Luma was a Wi-Fi solutions company based in Atlanta, Georgia The company sells Wi-Fi routers using mesh networking to project a consistent Wi-Fi signal throughout private homes as well as a corresponding mobile app for added layers of security and parental controls.

Luma was founded in 2014 by Paul Judge and Mike Van Bruinisse, who had worked together at cybersecurity firms CipherTrust and Purewire. The idea emerged as a response to what was perceived by the founders as poor Wi-Fi consistency throughout private homes and the need for increased security as the Internet of Things (IoT) becomes more pervasive. Judge said, “Cybersecurity must be built into the home network routers directly because IoT devices are vulnerable and users do not have the time to be the CISO [chief information security officer] of their home.”

To date, the company's funding includes $12.5 million from Amazon’s Alexa fund, as well as former Beats by Dre CMO Omar Johnson, Yahoo chairman Maynard Webb and San Francisco 49ers CEO Jed York. In November, 2016, Luma announced Alexa integration, allowing it to be controlled by voice commands to Amazon Alexa.

In January 2018, Luma Home was acquired by Newell Brands for a reported $10 million. The brand will operate under First Alert. At least since fall 2019 both the getluma.com and lumahome.com websites are not functional.

== See also ==
- Google Wifi
