= Daniel C. Ferguson =

American businessman

- Born: May 5, 1927 (age 99); Freeport, Illinois, U.S.
- Education: Hamilton College (New York) (1948) Stanford University (1950)
- Occupations: Retired Vice Chairman, CEO & Chairman of the Board of Newell Rubbermaid; Founder, Ferguson Partners, Ferguson Foundation; General Partner of Ferguson Partners & Trustee of the Ferguson Foundation

Daniel C. Ferguson (born May 5, 1927) is an American businessman and former president and director of Newell Rubbermaid.

== Early life and education ==
Ferguson was born on May 5, 1927, to Leonard C. Ferguson and Mildred F. Ferguson. Following in his fathers footsteps he attended Hamilton College in Clinton, New York after his release from the US Navy in 1946. He graduated in 1948 with a bachelor's degree in Economics and History. During his time there, he served as co-captain of the college basketball team.

== Business career ==
In 1950 after earning an MBA from Stanford University he began his business career with Newell Rubbermaid. Beginning in 1962 the affiliated Newell Companies, including Western Newell, Newell Window Furnishings and Newell Manufacturing were consolidated into a single corporation headquartered in Freeport, Illinois. Ferguson was hired as president that same year and elected as a Director in 1965. He developed a growth-by-acquisition strategy based on his intention to build a strong, multi-product company through "Newellization".
