= Donald E. Noble =

Donald E. Noble (January 21, 1915 – June 30, 2002) was an American businessman and the CEO of Wooster Rubber Company, the predecessor of Rubbermaid, from 1959 to 1980. He also founded TechniGraphics in Wooster.

== Education and work history ==
Noble was born January 21, 1915, in Lansing, Michigan, and he was raised in Cleveland, Ohio. Noble worked through the Depression while in university at National City Bank of Cleveland, starting as a messenger and advancing over his eight years of employment to a management position. He earned a degree in business administration from Western Reserve University in 1941.

Noble moved to Wooster, Ohio, in 1941 to join the Wooster Rubber Co, predecessor of Rubbermaid Inc., initially as chief accountant and assistant office manager. He was named CEO of Rubbermaid in 1959 and held the position until his retirement in 1980. During his tenure, Rubbermaid made the transformation from rubber products to plastic products, increased sales and developed a business plan which provided innovation through research and development. He increased sales over 1100 percent from $24.5 million to $305 million. Net earnings during his time as CEO increased from 21 cents to $2.96 per share.

== Community involvement ==
Noble was a noted benefactor to the College of Wooster, where he served on the board of trustees for 41 years. With his wife Alice he formed the Donald and Alice Noble Foundation in Wooster, Ohio. Shortly before his death, Noble built an ice rink in Wooster. He also helped found TechniGraphics, Inc. a mapping and engineering services company in Wooster.

== Family ==
Donald and Alice Noble were married on July 8, 1939, and were married for more than 60 years. Together they had four children: Richard, David, Jeanne and Nancy.
