= Sharpie (marker) =

American manufacturer of writing instruments

- Product type: Marker pens, highlighters, gel pens, rollerball pens, acrylic paint markers
- Current owner: Newell Brands
- Country: United States
- Introduced: 1964; 62 years ago
- Markets: Worldwide
- Previous owners: Sanford L.P. (1964–1990)
- Website: sharpie.com

Sharpie is a brand of writing implement (mainly permanent markers) manufactured by Newell Brands, a public company headquartered in Atlanta, Georgia. Originally designating a single permanent marker, the Sharpie brand has been widely expanded and can now be found on a variety of previously unrelated permanent and non-permanent pens and markers formerly marketed under other brands.

Sharpie markers are made with several tips, including ultra fine, extra fine, fine, brush, chisel, mini, magnum, and retractable.

Sharpie also produces highlighter pens, gel pens, rollerball pens, and acrylic paint markers.

== History ==
Sharpie products
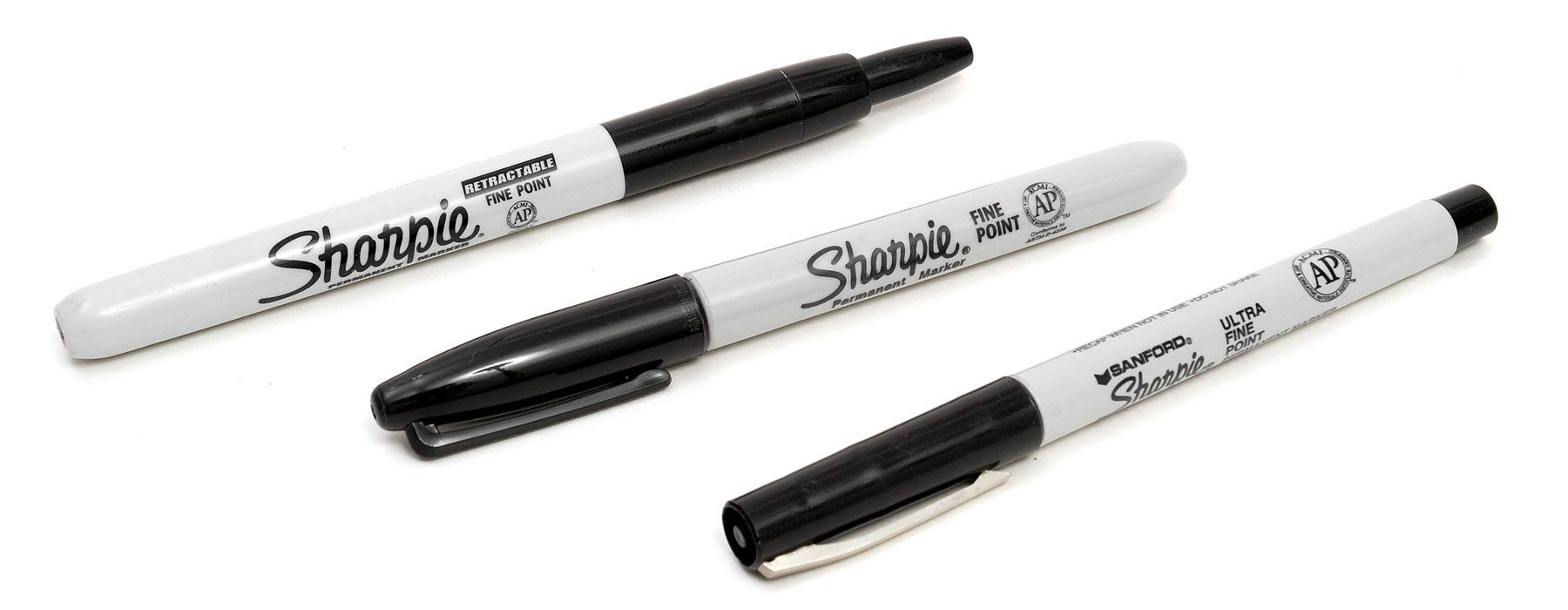
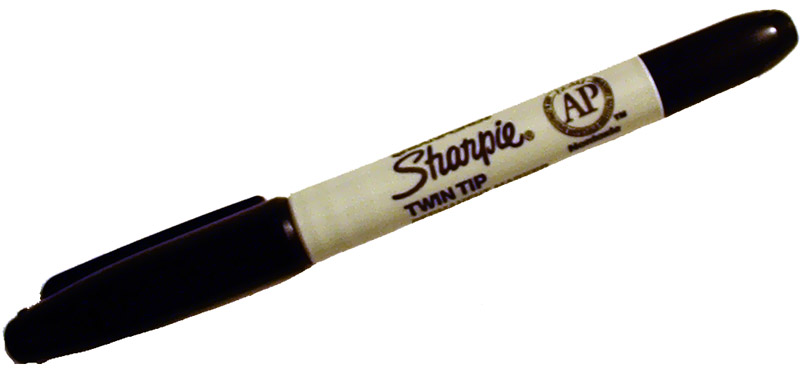
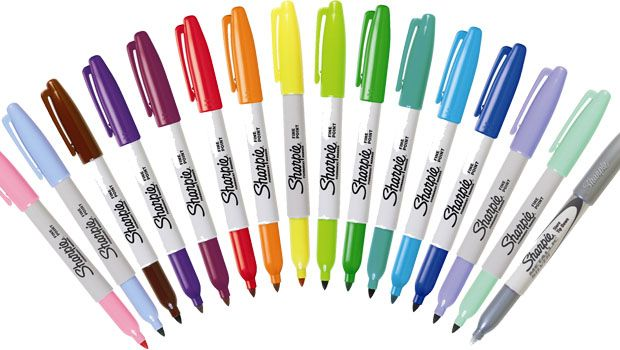
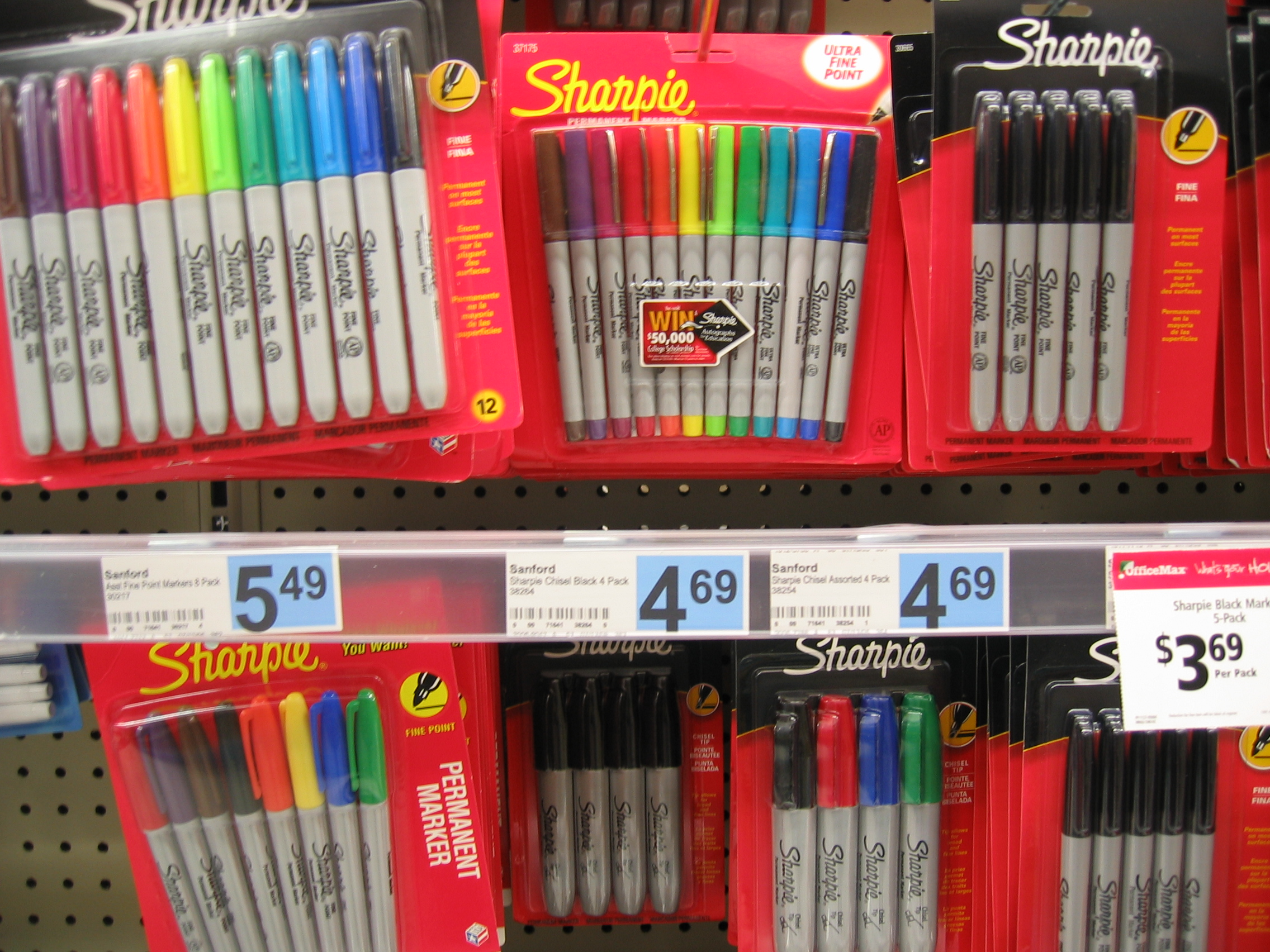
From left to right (above): marker types, black marker; (below): color markers line, and several Sharpies exhibited in a store

"Sharpie" was originally a permanent marker launched in 1964 by the Sanford Ink Company. The Sharpie was the first pen-style permanent marker.

In 1990, Sharpie was acquired by The Newell Companies (later Newell Rubbermaid) as part of Sanford, a leading manufacturer and marketer of writing instruments.

In 2005, the company's Accent highlighter brand was repositioned under the Sharpie brand name. The Sharpie Mini, a smaller marker with a clip for attaching a keychain or lanyard was also launched. In 2006, Sharpie introduced markers with button-activated retractable tips rather than a cap. Sharpie Paint markers were also introduced. As of 2011, 200 million Sharpies had been sold worldwide. Sharpie markers are manufactured in Mexicali, Baja California, Mexico, and Maryville, Tennessee, and with numerous off-shore partners globally.

== Marketing ==
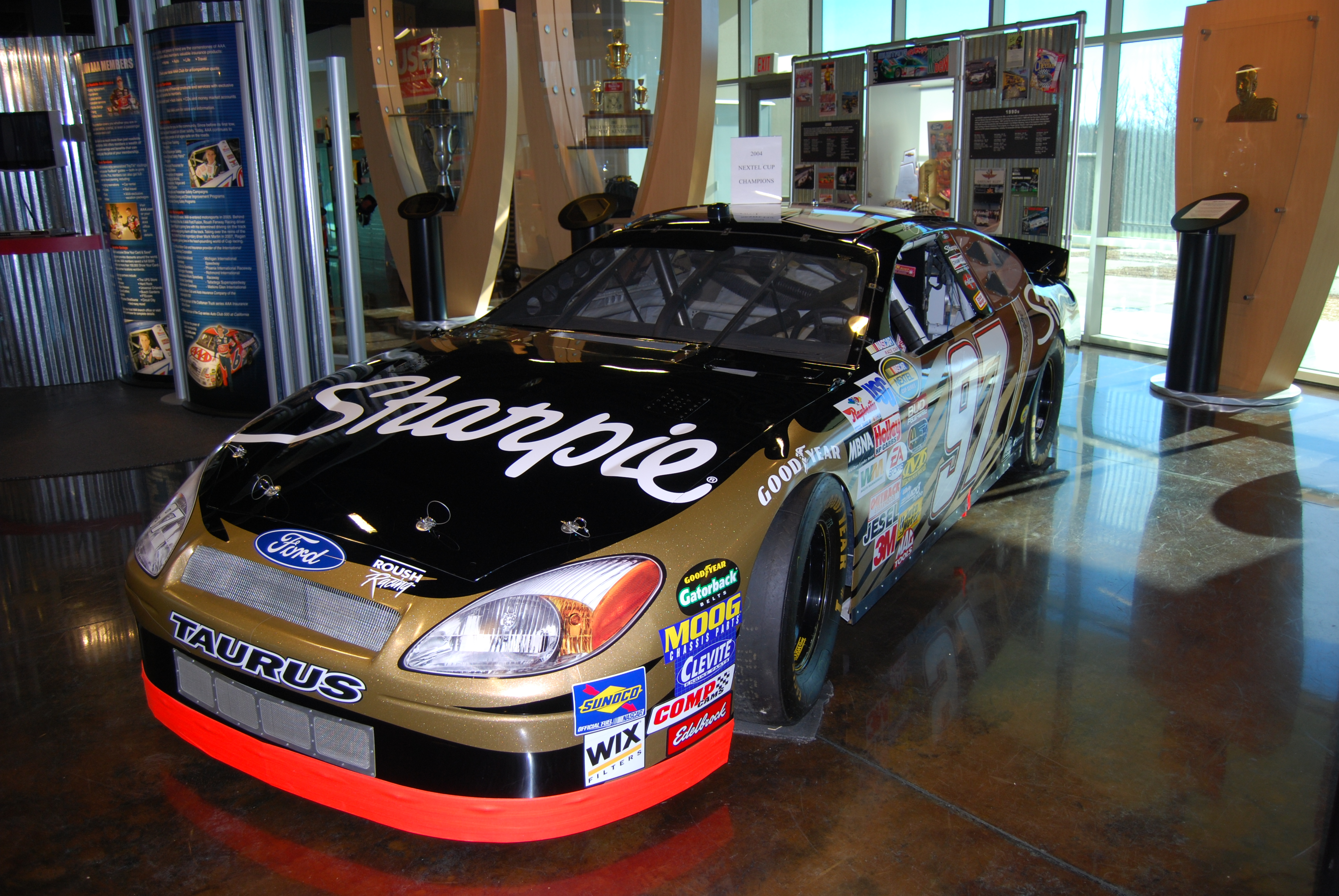
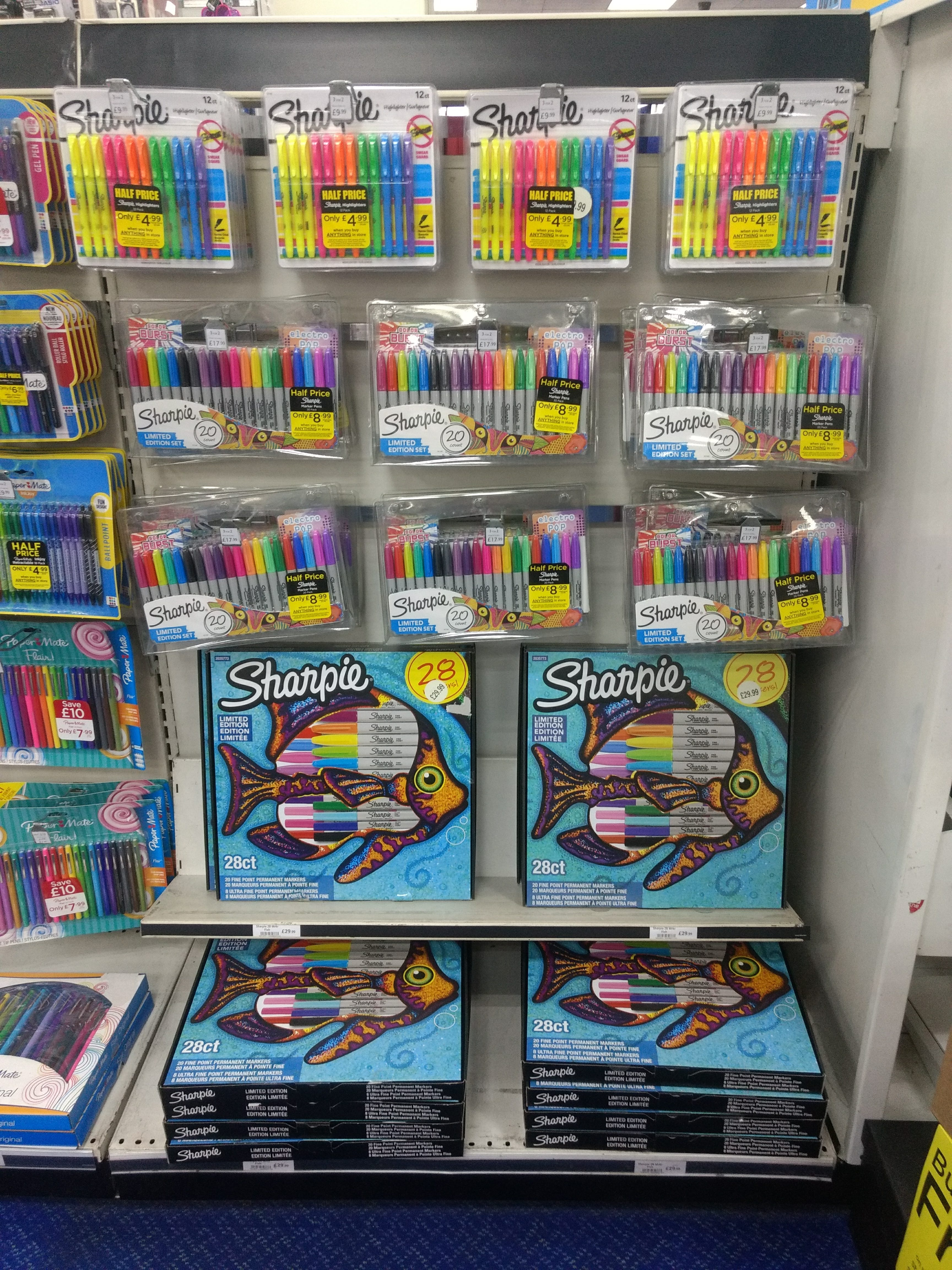
Fltr (left): Sharpie sponsorship on a NASCAR cup car, 2014; (right): branded products on sale in London

Sharpie sponsored the NASCAR Sprint Cup Series Sharpie 500, a night-time race at Bristol Motor Speedway, from 2001 through 2009. For the 2010 season, Newell Rubbermaid switched the sponsorship for this race to its Irwin Tools brand. Sharpie sponsored the Nationwide Series Sharpie Mini 300 race from 2004 to 2008. Before 2006, they sponsored Kurt Busch, who was the 2004 Sprint Cup champion. Sharpie also sponsored Jamie McMurray in the 2006 NASCAR Sprint Cup Series and the 2008 NASCAR Sprint Cup Series.

In recent years, Sharpie commercials have followed the slogan "Write Out Loud". These advertisements depict people using Sharpies in bad situations, such as using the marker to touch up a car and a college woman highlighting words in a book to notify a male student that his fly was open. Also, a middle-aged woman trying to think of what to write for her resignation letter, writes "I QUIT" with a red Sharpie. David Beckham is sponsored by Sharpie and appears in a commercial signing autographs with a Sharpie and trying to steal them.

== In popular culture ==
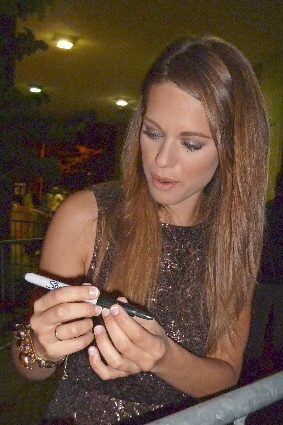
Actress Lyndsy Fonseca handling a Sharpie at the 2010 Toronto Film Festival

External videos
- "Trump says he swapped White House thousand-dollar pens for Sharpie markers", YouTube video from C-SPAN, March 2026

Special Camp David Sharpies were made for United States President George W. Bush.

Sharpies are the writing utensil of choice for astronauts aboard the International Space Station because of their usability in zero-gravity. According to Canadian astronaut Chris Hadfield, who commanded the International Space Station in 2012–2013, "you can hold it any which way and it still works".
