= Rubbermaid =

American manufacturer and distributor of household items

- Formerly: The Wooster Rubber Company (1920–57)
- Type: Subsidiary
- Industry: Plastics
- Founded: May 1920; 106 years ago in Wooster, Ohio, U.S.
- Fate: Acquired by Newell in 1999
- Headquarters: Atlanta, Georgia, U.S.
- Key people: Donald Noble; Stanley C. Gault
- Products: Consumer household goods
- Parent: Newell Brands
- Website: rubbermaid.com

Rubbermaid is an American manufacturer and distributor of household items. A subsidiary of Newell Brands, it is best known for producing food storage containers and trash cans. It also produces sheds, step stools, closets and shelving, laundry baskets, bins, air fresheners and other household items.

== History ==
Rubbermaid was founded in 1920 in Wooster, Ohio, as the Wooster Rubber Company by nine businessmen. Originally, Wooster Rubber Company manufactured toy balloons.

In 1933, James R. Caldwell and his wife received a patent for their blue rubber dustpan. They called their line of rubber kitchen products Rubbermaid.

In 1934 Horatio Ebert saw Rubbermaid products at a New England department store, and believed such products could help his struggling Wooster Rubber. He engineered a merger of the two enterprises in July 1934. Still named the Wooster Company, the new group began to produce rubber household products under the Rubbermaid brand name.

In 1984, Rubbermaid acquired Little Tikes, a toy maker. In 1985, Rubbermaid acquired competitor Gott Corporation. In 1996, Rubbermaid acquired Graco baby products.

In 1999, Rubbermaid was purchased by Newell for $6 billion. Then Newell changed its name to Newell Rubbermaid. Newell Rubbermaid changed its name again to the present-day Newell Brands in 2016 as part of a takeover of Jarden in another merger.

In 2003, the company announced its move out of Wooster to Atlanta, Georgia; 850 manufacturing and warehouse jobs would be eliminated, and 409 office jobs would move to other locations. A Rubbermaid distribution center remained at the former headquarters for some time, until it was in 2015 rented by GOJO Industries, Inc.

On November 16, 2004, Rubbermaid was used as a prime example in the PBS Frontline documentary "Is Walmart Good for America?".

== Timeline ==
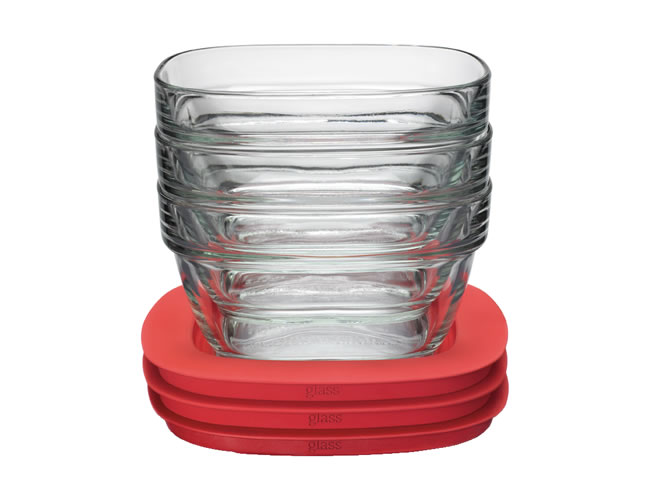
Rubbermaid glass food storage containers

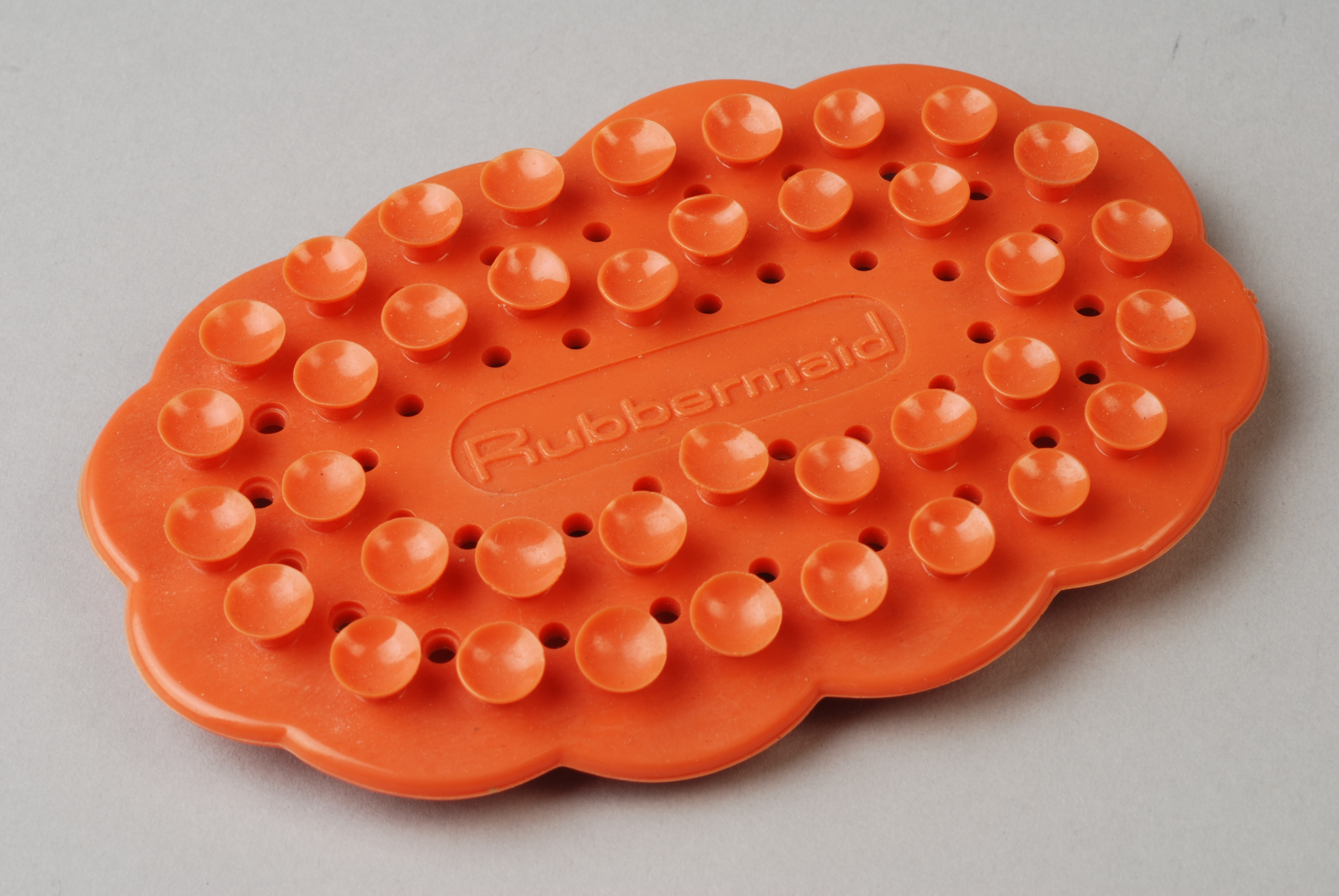
Oval orange plastic soap dish

- 1920 Wooster Rubber is launched.
- 1927 Horatio Ebert and Errett Grable took over managing the company from the original 9 founders.
- 1933 Rubbermaid is launched.
- 1933 First Rubbermaid dustpan is introduced.
- 1934 Wooster Rubber and Rubbermaid merge to form Wooster Rubber Company and sell Rubbermaid products.
- 1942 WW2 eliminated Rubbermaid's housewares business, but the company was able to convert to military manufacturing.
- 1947 Rubbermaid introduces a line of rubber automotive accessories.
- 1955 Wooster Rubber Co. offer first public offering.
- 1956 Rubbermaid ventures into plastic products.
- 1957 Wooster Rubber Company changes name to Rubbermaid.
- 1965 Purchases German company Dupol.
- 1976 1,100 members of the United Rubber Workers union call a strike.
- 1981 Purchases Con-Tact plastic coverings.
- 1984 Acquires the Little Tikes Company.
- 1999 Newell acquires Rubbermaid for $5.8 billion and changes corporate name to Newell Rubbermaid.
- 2003 Rubbermaid headquarters move from Wooster, Ohio to Atlanta, GA.
- 2016 Newell Rubbermaid becomes Newell Brands as part of a takeover of Jarden in a merger.
- 2017 Newell sells the Rubbermaid totes line to United Solutions.

== Former CEOs ==
- 1933–1959 James Caldwell
- 1959–1980 Donald Noble
- 1980–1991 Stanley C. Gault
- 1991–1992 Walter W. Williams
- 1993–1999 Wolfgang Schmitt

== Acquisitions ==
Prior to Rubbermaid merging with Newell Company.

- 1965 Dupol - German
- 1981 Carlan
- 1984 Little Tikes - Sold to MGA Entertainment in 2006.
- 1985 Gott Corporation
- 1986 MicroComputer Accessories
- 1986 Seco Industries
- 1987 Viking Brush - Canadian
- 1990 Eldon Industries
- 1992 Iron Mountain Forge Corporation
- 1994 Carex Health Care Products
- 1995 Injectaplastic S.A - French
- 1996 Graco (baby products)
- 1997 Curver - Europe - Sold in 2005.

== See also ==
- Lock & Lock
- Newell Brands
- Tupperware
