= Levolor =

American window blinds and shades manufacturers

- Industry: Window blinds and shades manufacturer
- Founded: 1914
- Headquarters: Atlanta, Georgia
- Key people: Sanjiv Chhatwal (president)

Levolor is an American manufacturer of custom window blinds and shades, as well as stock blinds and shades.

Levolor is headquartered in the Atlanta, Georgia metropolitan area, and operates in the United States, Canada, Mexico, and China. The company was purchased by Hunter Douglas in 2016.

== History ==
The company was founded in 1914 in Hoboken, New Jersey by Hans K. Lorentzen, a Danish immigrant who originally started out as a tool and die maker. Lorentzen introduced standardization, vertical integration, metal manufacturing and assembly lines to the window blinds industry.

In 1993, Levolor was acquired by Newell. The company was sold to Hunter Douglas, a Dutch custom window blind manufacturer, in July 2016 for a reported US$270 million.
