= Mr. Sketch =

Scented markers brand

- Product type: Marker pens
- Current owner: Newell Brands
- Country: United States
- Introduced: 1965; 61 years ago
- Previous owners: Sanford
- Website: mrsketch.com

Mr. Sketch is a brand of scented markers, currently owned by Newell Brands. Its markers are sold in packages of 4, 6, 8, 10, 12 and 18 and 22 units. Mr. Sketch markers come in both chisel and fine point. The markers have large strokes and can be used for posters and group work. Mr. Sketch markers have many different colors to choose from.

Mr. Sketch markers were originally introduced by the Sanford Manufacturing Co. in 1965, and have been popular with young children.

== Colors and fragrances ==
=== 4 set ===
Color	Scent
Red	Cherry
Yellow	Banana
Green	Mint
Blue	Blueberry

=== 12 set (*additional colors) ===
Color	Flavor
Red	Cherry
Orange	Orange
Yellow	Banana
Green	Mint
Dark Green*	Apple
Turquoise*	Fruit Punch
Blue	Blueberry
Purple	Grape
Pink*	Watermelon
Magenta*	Raspberry
Black	Licorice
Brown	Cinnamon

=== 18 set (*additional colors) ===
Color	Flavor
Red	Cherry
Orange	Orange
Peach*	Peach
Yellow	Lemon
Light Yellow*	Banana
Mint Green*	Tropical Punch
Green	Mint
Dark Green	Apple
Turquoise	Mango
Light Blue*	Blue Raspberry Slushy
Blue	Blueberry
Purple	Grape
Lavender*	Cotton Candy
Pink	Melon
Magenta	Raspberry
Pink	Bubble Gum
Black	Licorice
Brown	Cinnamon

=== 6 set (Ice Cream) ===
Color	Flavor
Red	Strawberry
Yellow	Lemon Ice
Green	Mint Chocolate Chip
Blue	Stinky Cheese
Pink	Bubble Gum
Brown	Chocolate

=== 6 set (movie night; *additional colors) ===
Color	Flavor
Orange	Nacho Cheese
Yellow	Buttery Popcorn
Blue	Blue Raspberry Slushy
Magenta	Hard Candy
Light Brown	Root Beer
Dark Brown*	Chocolate Mint

=== 6 set (intergalactic; *additional neon colors) ===
Color	Scent
Neon Orange*	Smokey Cinnamon Rocket Fuel
Neon Yellow*	Pineapple Shooting Star
Neon Green*	Rotten Melon Alien Ooze
Neon Blue*	Galactic Fruit Punch
Neon Purple*	Black Raspberry Moon Rocks
Neon Pink*	Cosmic Pink Lemonade

=== 6 set (holiday) ===
Color	Scent
Red	Candy Cane
Light Yellow	Santa's Cookie
Green	Christmas Tree
Magenta	Sugar Plum
Brown	Gingerbread
Black	Smoke

=== Note ===
On the 18 pack of Mr. Sketch crayons, there are 2 flavors (with additional colors that haven't been remained on the markers):

Color	Scent
Black	Black Raspberry
White	White Vanilla Icing
