= Stanley Gault =

American businessman (1926–2016)

- Born: Stanley Carleton Gault; January 6, 1926; Wooster, Ohio, U.S.
- Died: June 29, 2016 (aged 90); Cleveland, Ohio, U.S.
- Education: The College of Wooster
- Occupations: CEO and Chairman of Goodyear and Rubbermaid
- Spouse: Flo Kurtz (m. 1950; died 2013)
- Children: 3

Stanley Carleton Gault (January 6, 1926 – June 29, 2016) was an American businessman.

== Early life and education ==
He was born on January 6, 1926, in Wooster, Ohio, to Clyde and Asenath Gault. He graduated from the College of Wooster in 1948 with a bachelor's degree in geology, and remained as Chairman Emeritus of the Board. While studying at the College of Wooster, he served in the Army Air Corps as a B-29 gunner during World War II.

== Career ==
Gault spent 31 years with General Electric in various positions, including being head of G.E.'s consumer products division and later its industrial products division. In 1979, he was named Chairman of the Board and CEO of Rubbermaid. After taking over at Rubbermaid, Gault removed all but two managers at the company and reorganized it. He led the company through a series of divestitures and strategic investments that increased the company's profitability. While he stripped weak product lines and slashed excess cost, he invested in new product development. Later Rubbermaid CEOs, including Wolfgang Schmitt, were seen as less than adequate compared to Gault and the company's profits dropped. Rubbermaid ended up being bought in 1999 by a competitor, Newell.

Starting in 1985, Gault was appointed as a director at Avon Products, Inc. He became CEO and Chairman of The Goodyear Tire and Rubber Company after retiring from Rubbermaid in 1991.

In 1994, he was inducted into Junior Achievement's U.S. Business Hall of Fame. In 1995, Gault received the Golden Plate Award of the American Academy of Achievement.

In 2001, Gault stepped down as director at Avon.

Gault died on June 29, 2016, in Cleveland, Ohio, after a brief illness. Gault often donated to the city of Wooster and his alma mater.
