= Paper Mate =

American writing implement company

Paper Mate & Associates
- Type: Subsidiary
- Industry: Stationery
- Founded: 1940; 86 years ago (as Frawley Pen Company)
- Founder: Patrick J. Frawley
- Headquarters: Oak Brook, Illinois, U.S.
- Area served: Worldwide
- Products: Ballpoint and gel pens, mechanical pencils, erasers, correction fluids
- Owner: Newell Brands
- Parent: Sanford L.P.
- Website: papermate.com

Paper Mate is a division of Sanford L.P., a Newell Brands company that produces writing instruments. Paper Mate's offices are located in Oak Brook, Illinois, along with those of Newell Brands' other office products divisions.

Its product line includes ballpoint and gel pens, mechanical pencils and wooden pencils, erasers, and correction fluids.

== History ==
Early in 1941, Patrick J. Frawley acquired his first company, a ballpoint pen parts manufacturer that had defaulted on its loan. In 1949, The Frawley Pen Company developed an ink that dried instantly. The pen that delivered this ink was called "The Paper Mate".

In 1951, Frawley sold 4 million pens and had 22 salesmen visit 2,400 stores within six weeks to advertise the ballpoint pen product by testing the ink on retailers' shirts, promising a new $15 shirt if the ink was not able to come off.

In 1955, the Frawley Pen Company was acquired by The Gillette Company, Inc. for $15.5 million, and formed the basis for the Paper Mate Division of Gillette. Twenty-five years later, in 1980, Gillette acquired Liquid Paper and Waterman; with these acquisitions, the Paper Mate Division was changed to the Stationery Products Group.

In late 2000, Gillette's stationery products division was purchased by Newell Rubbermaid and merged with Newell Rubbermaid's Sanford Brands division. As an employee of Paper Mate, Norman Holtzman designed the double heart logo over 50 years ago, and it is still the Paper Mate identity in 2024.

== Products ==
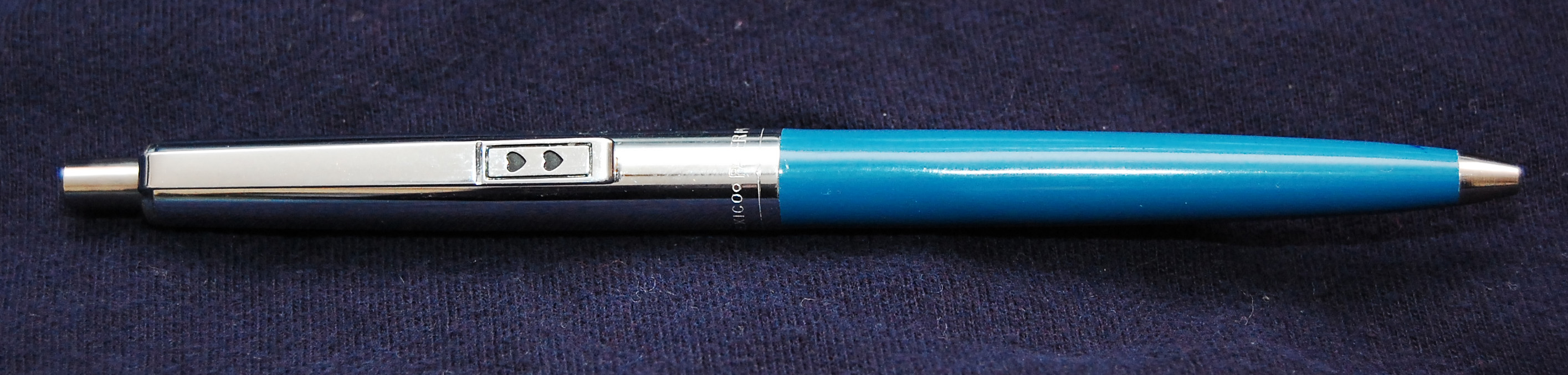
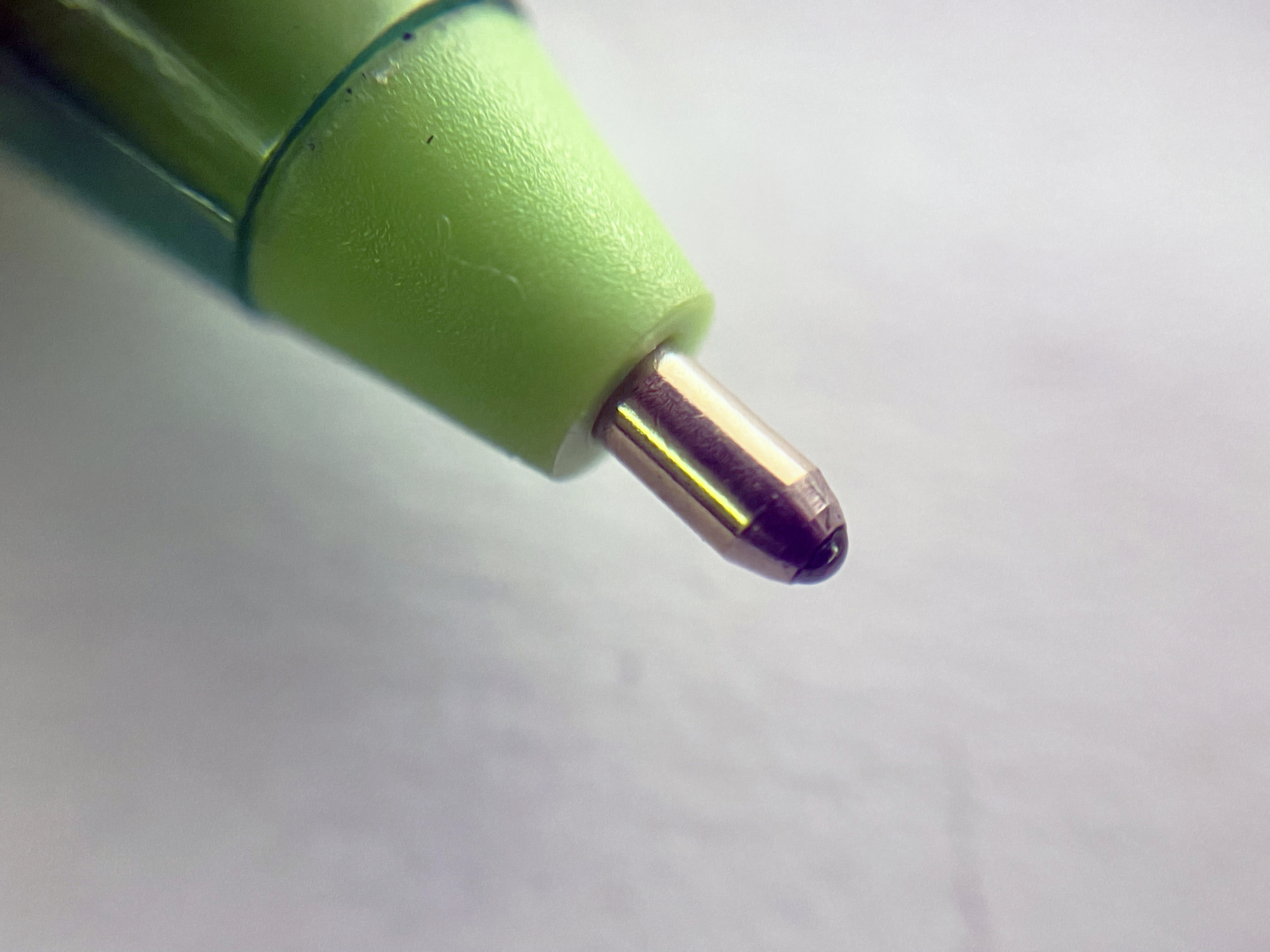
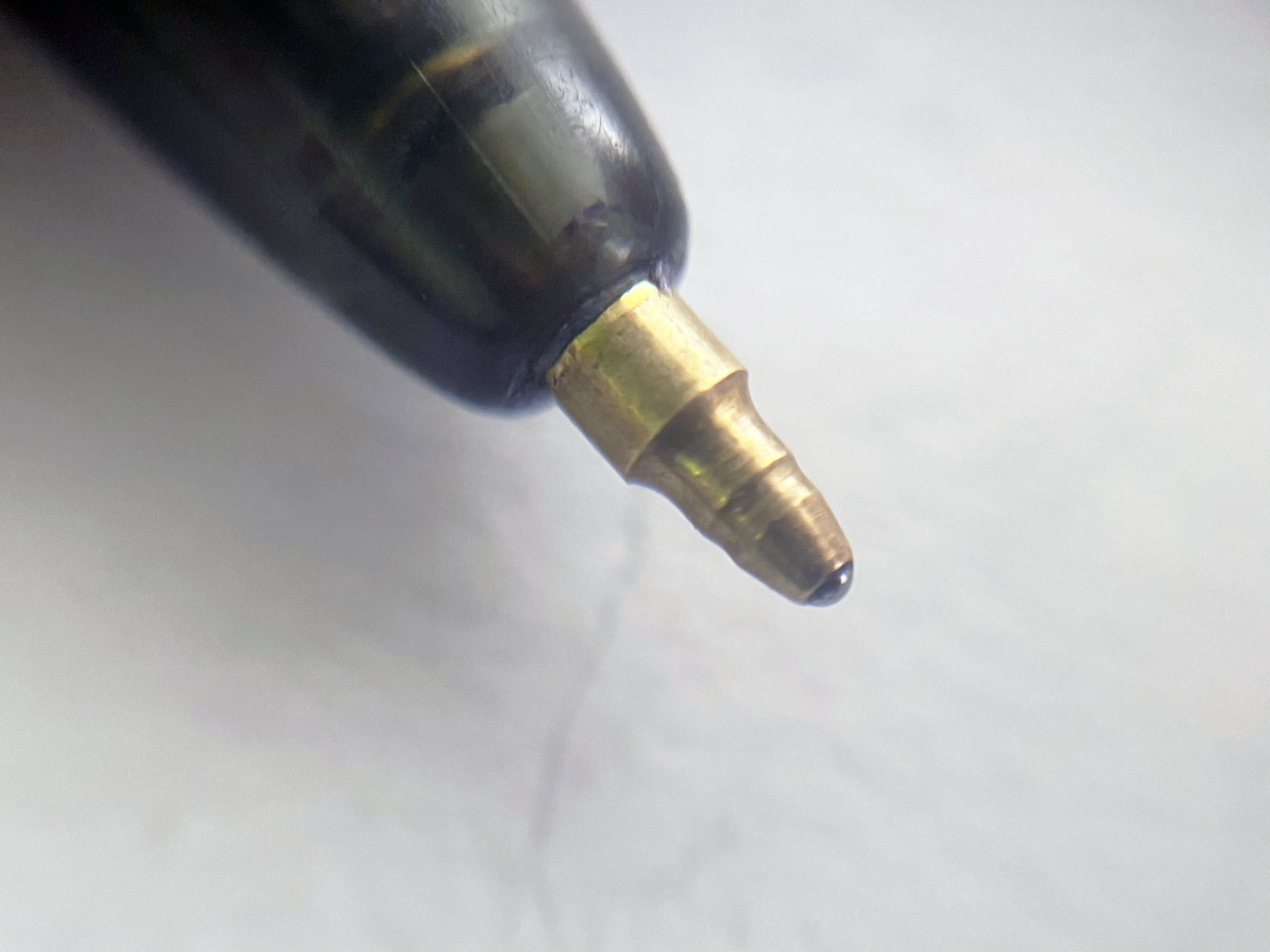
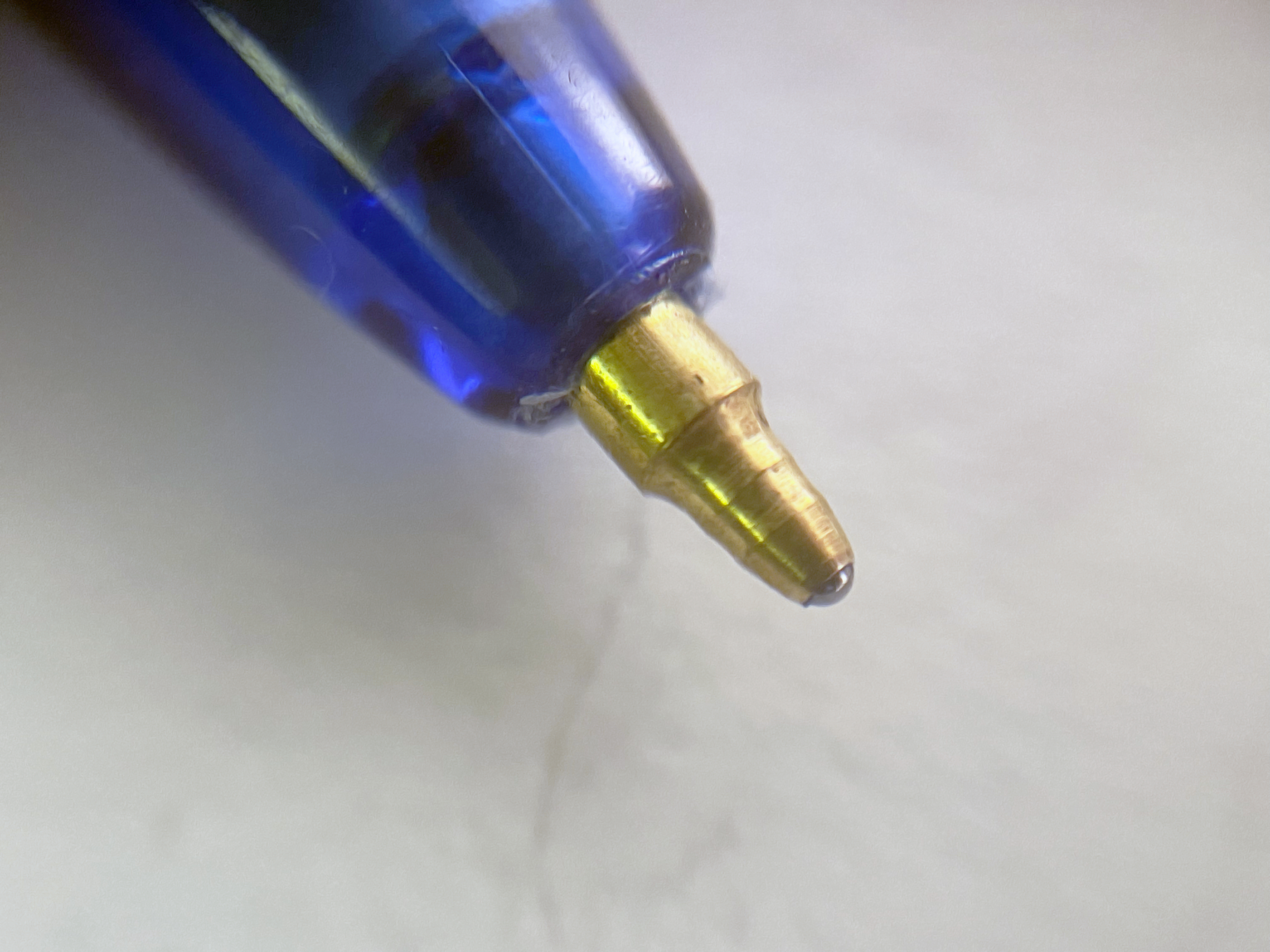
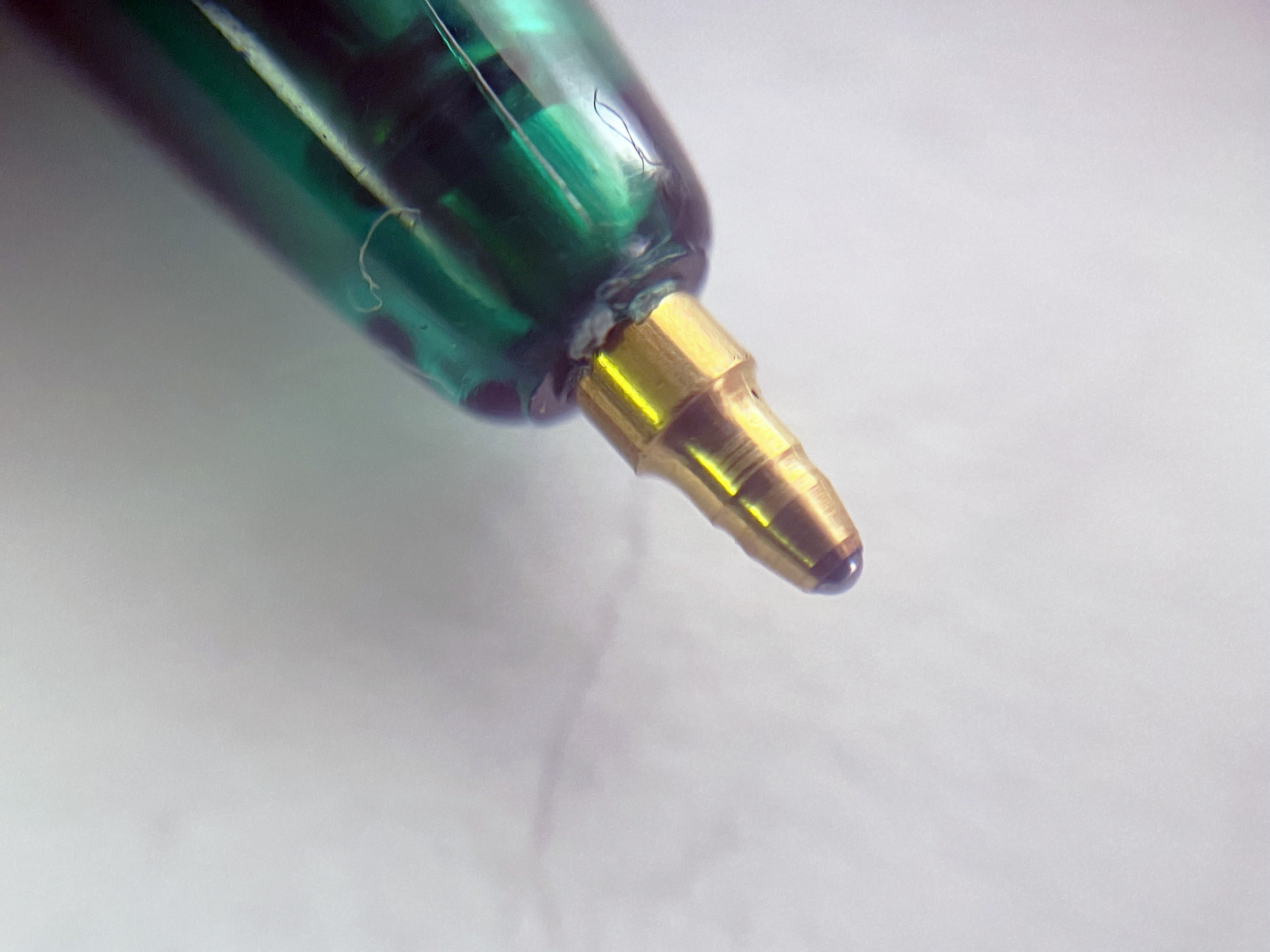
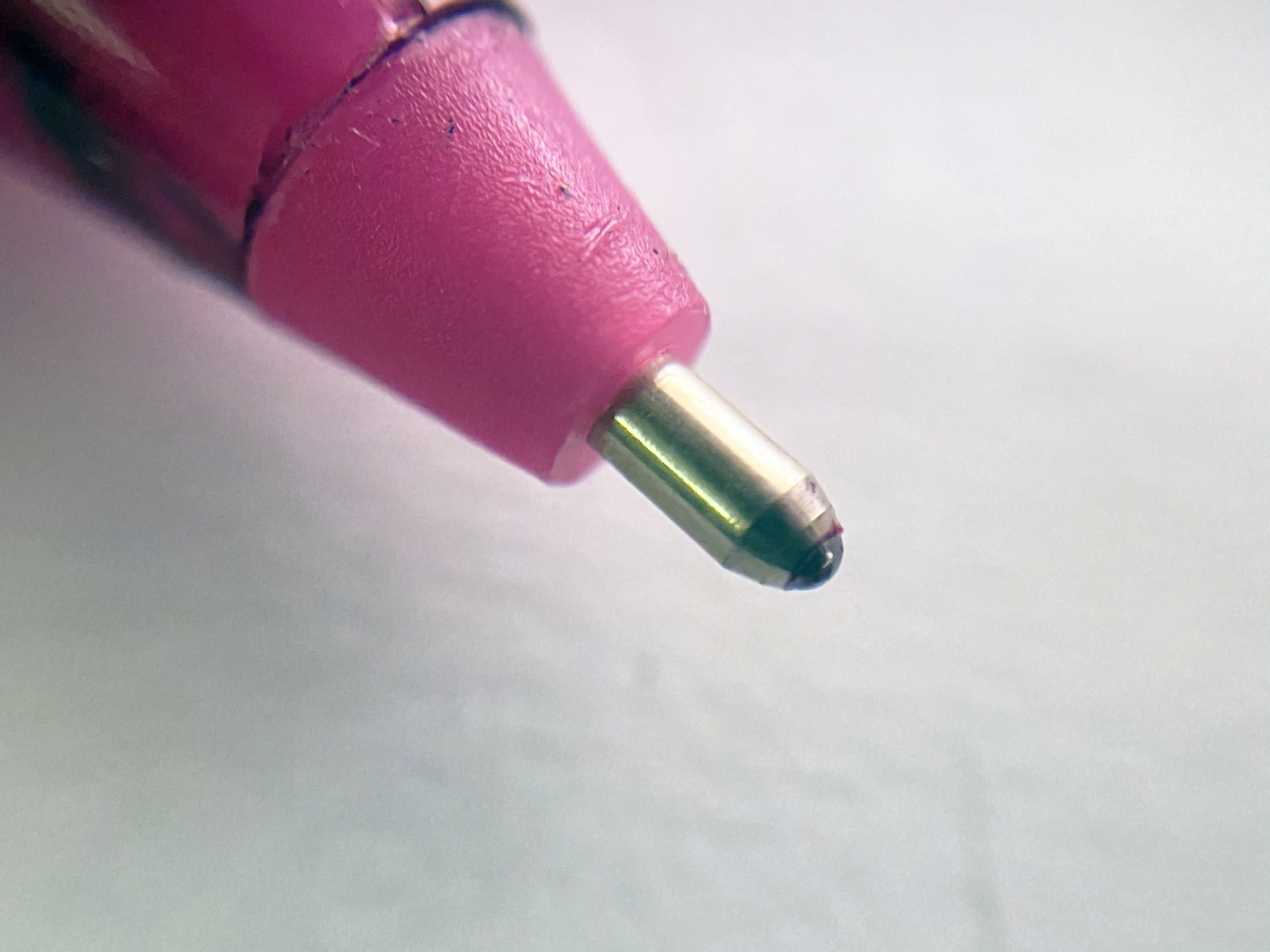
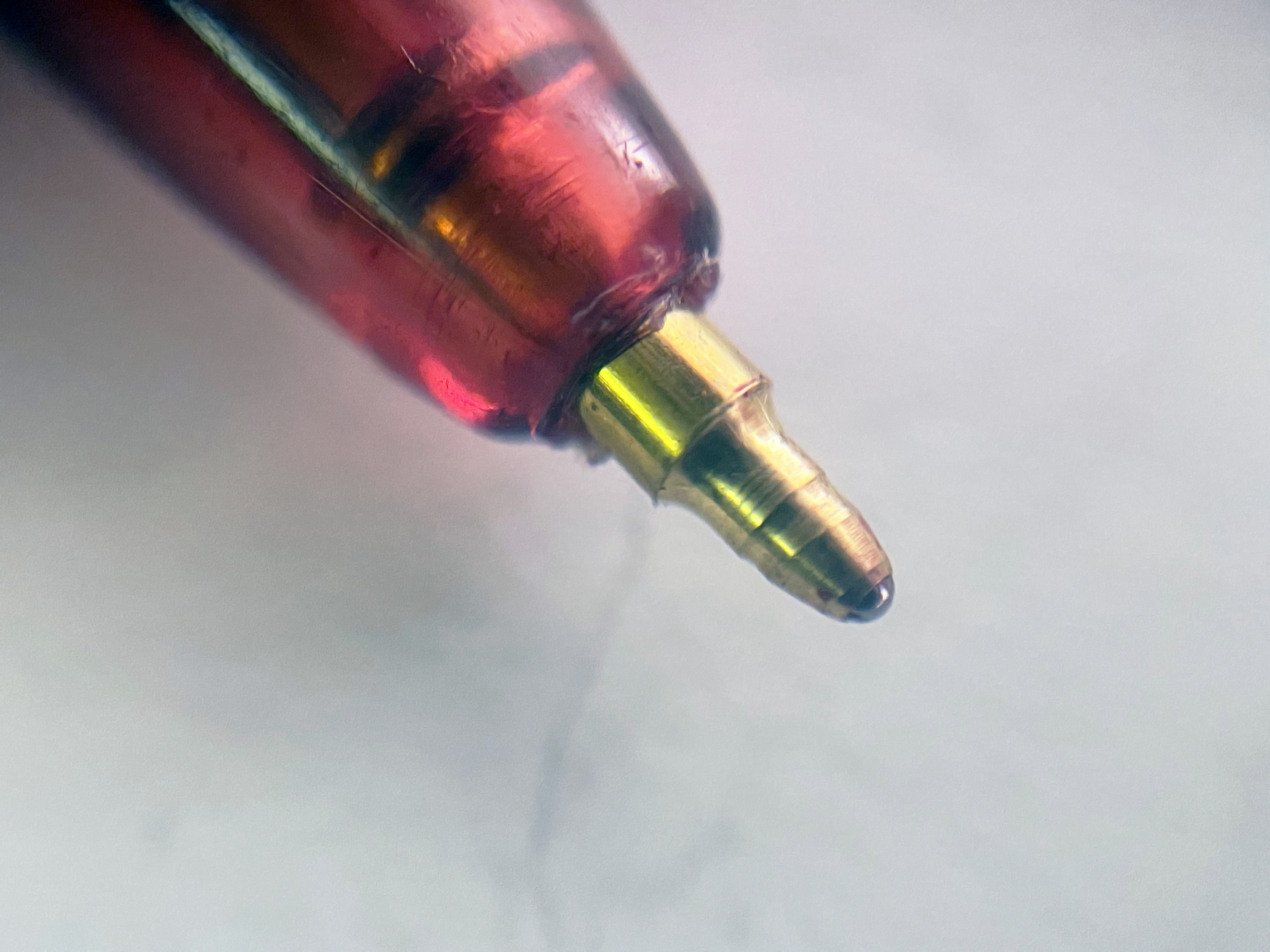
(Upper): Paper Mate Profile ballpoint pen; (below): some ballpen point details

Paper Mate products are offered in a variety of colors and shapes.

In 1966, the Flair pen was released. The marker is a felt-tipped pen with quick-drying water-based ink.

In 1979, Paper Mate introduced the Eraser Mate or Erasermate brand.

In the 1980s, Paper Mate invented the Replay 2000 pen, with erasable ink and an eraser at one end.

In 2010, Paper Mate introduced "environmentally friendly" biodegradable pens, pencils and erasers.

In 2012, Paper Mate introduced the brand InkJoy.

In 2017, Paper Mate introduced the Clearpoint Color Lead Mechanical Pencil series.

In the 1980s and 1990s, Paper Mate branded their correction fluid as 'Twink' in New Zealand which became a genericized trademark, with Twink becoming a term for correction fluid in common parlance.
