= NUK (brand) =

German brand of childcare products

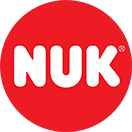

NUK (/nʊk/ nuuk^{α}) is a German baby-products company based in Zeven, Germany. Owned by Newell Brands, the letters originally stood for “Natürlich Und Kiefergerecht” (Natural And Orthodontic).

== History ==
In 1956, dentists Wilhelm Balters and Adolf Müller developed an asymmetrically shaped teat for feeding and calming babies. The doctors observed that babies who were breastfed were less likely to later suffer from misaligned teeth and jaw deformations. The two doctors developed the asymmetrical shape of the NUK teat based on the anatomy of the child's palate.

The export department was set up in 1975 and NUK products were subsequently exported from the Zeven location to 48 countries.

== Notes ==
^α Rhymes with "book"
