= ACON Investments =

American investment management firm

- Company type: Private company
- Industry: Investments
- Founded: 1996; 30 years ago
- Headquarters: Washington, D.C., United States
- Website: aconinvestments.com

ACON Investments is an American international private equity investment company that administers private equity funds as well as special purpose partnerships which invest in Latin America, the United States, and Europe. The organization was started in 1996, and is based in Washington, D.C. It is responsible for administrating over US$5 billion worth of capital. The company has facilities in District of Columbia, Mexico City, Los Angeles, Bogotá, and São Paulo.

== Subsidiaries ==
- Igloo Products
- Funko
- In August 2018, ACON Investments purchased Goody Products, Inc. from Newell Brands.
- BioMatrix Specialty Pharmacy
