= Mei Xu =

Chinese-American businesswoman

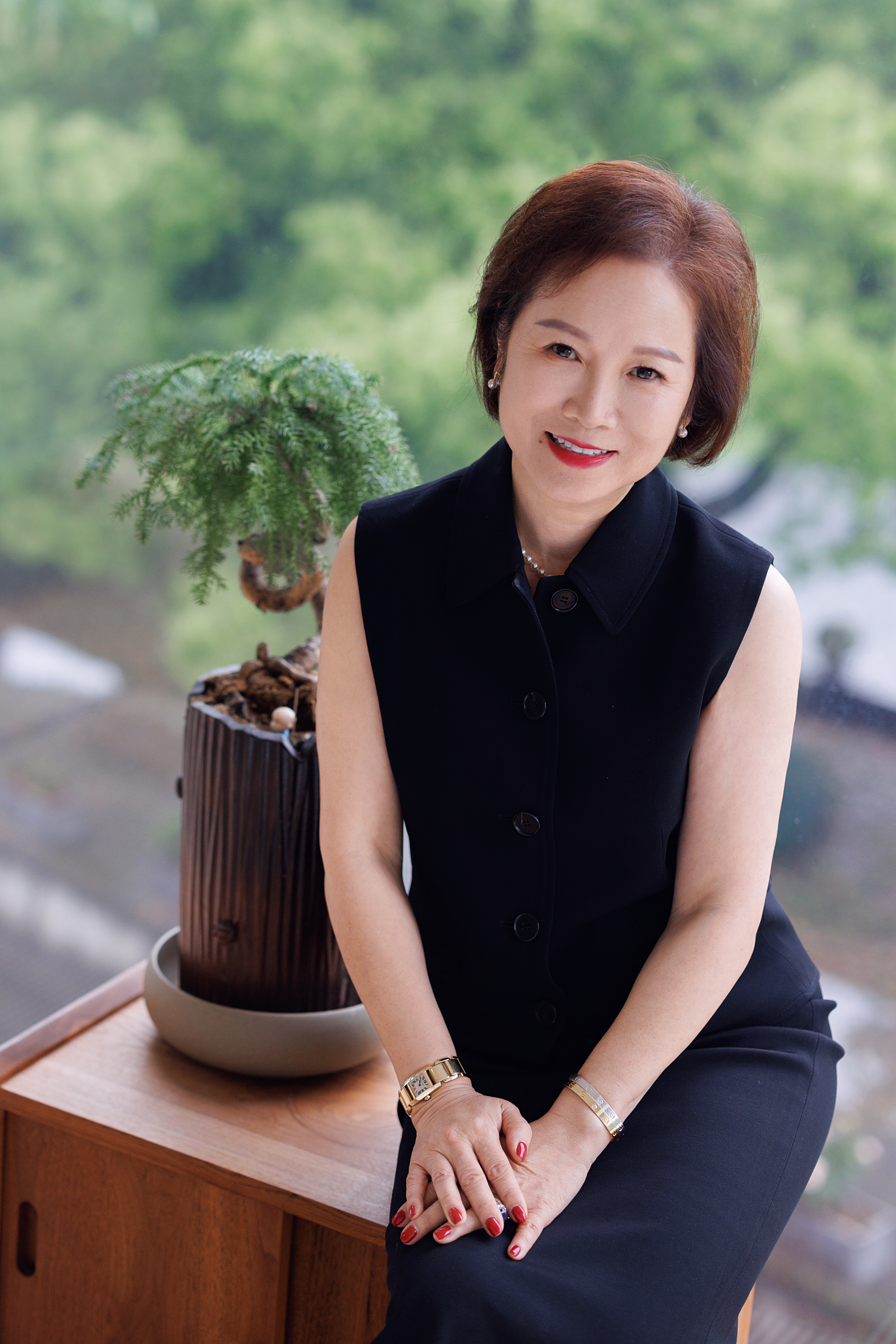
- Born: Hangzhou, China
- Education: Master's in Journalism
- Alma mater: University of Maryland
- Occupation: Entrepreneur
- Known for: Founder and CEO of Pacific Trade International

Mei Xu (born in 1967) is a Chinese-American businesswoman who founded Pacific Trade International and its subsidiary, Chesapeake Bay Candle. Xu stepped down in November 2018 as CEO of Chesapeake Bay Candle. She is the CEO of Mei Xu & Co. LLC and its online platform, YesSheMay.com, a community and marketplace for women entrepreneurs.

In 2023, she launched Blueme, a sustainable functional fragrance brand, in department stores, such as Bloomingdale’s and Saks Fifth Avenue.

== Awards ==
- Forbes Magazine’s “Outstanding Women Over 50 with Vision Award” (2021)
- Forbes Magazine’s “60 Most Outstanding Chinese in North America” Award (2021)
- Politico’s “Woman of Impact” Award (2019)
- Inc. Magazine’s “America’s Fastest-Growing Companies in 2000 and 2001” award

== Early life and education ==
Xu grew up in Hangzhou, China. At the age of 12, she was among 80 children selected to be trained as a future diplomat and was sent to study at the Hangzhou Foreign Language School. After graduation, she attended Beijing Foreign Studies University. While there, she worked as a part-time project manager for the World Bank. She graduated in 1989 with a BA in American studies.

In response to the Tiananmen Square protests of 1989, the Chinese government assigned menial jobs to many youths. Xu was assigned to track mineral deliveries at a warehouse in Dalian. Frustrated with the work, Xu quit and would eventually move to the United States to study journalism at the University of Maryland. She earned a master's degree in the subject. After graduation, she hoped to return to work for the World Bank, but was thwarted by a hiring freeze.

== Career ==
Xu first found a job at a medical company in New York City. She would then return to Annapolis, Maryland, in 1994, co-founding (with her then husband, David Wang) Pacific Trade International, a candle and home decor company. She was initially inspired to create the company because of her frequent walk-throughs of a local Bloomingdale's in New York. In its first year of operation, Pacific Trade International earned $500,000.

Xu and Wang would experiment with candle-making in their home with wax poured into soup cans, ultimately creating the company's flagship brand, Chesapeake Bay Candle. In 1995, Xu's sister opened a factory in Hangzhou to manufacture the candles.

In 2005, Xu founded an interior lifestyle brand, Blissliving Home. Two years later, the Asian Women in Business organization honored her with their Entrepreneurial Leadership Award. In 2011, Xu opened another production and distribution facility in Glen Burnie, Maryland. In 2014, U.S. Senator Ben Cardin toured that facility.

In September 2017, it was announced that New Jersey company Newell Brands had acquired Chesapeake Bay Candle for $75 million. Pacific Trade International was not included in the deal, and Xu remained CEO of that company. She stepped down in 2018.

Mei participated in the White House In-Sourcing American Jobs Forum 2011 hosted by President Barack Obama and Vice President Joe Biden, among dozens of CEOs, such as Ford and Intel.
