= White Mountain Products =

American ice cream manufacturer

White Mountain Products is a brand of ice cream makers in the Sunbeam products division. It is a subsidiary of Newell Brands.

Thomas Sands started White Mountain Freezer Company in Laconia, New Hampshire, in 1872. In 1881 their factory was destroyed by fire. White Mountain Freezer Company moved to Nashua, New Hampshire, between the tracks of the Worcester & Nashua and Nashua Acton railroads.

In May 1930 a fire destroyed the factory, and a new one was built on Broad Street in Nashua. In 1963, the company was sold to the Alaska Freezer Company of Winchendon, Massachusetts.

In 1974, an investor group, headed by William H. Potter, Jr., purchased the company, renaming the entire company "White Mountain Freezer, Inc."

It was later bought by Berkshire Partners and then sold to Jarden Corporation in 2005. In 2016 the Jarden corporation merged with Newell Rubbermaid and changed their name to Newell Brands.
