= Prismacolor =

Brand of visual arts supplies

- Product type: Colored pencil
- Current owner: Newell Brands (1995–)
- Produced by: Newell Brands
- Country: U.S.
- Introduced: 1938; 88 years ago
- Previous owners: Eagle Pencil Company (1938–69); Berol (1969–95)
- Website: prismacolor.com

Prismacolor is a brand of professional visual arts supplies originated in 1938 by the Eagle Pencil Company (rebranded to Berol), and now currently manufactured by Newell Brands. Prismacolor products include, colored and graphite pencils, soft pastels, erasers, pencil sharpeners, and cases. In past years, Prismacolor also produced watercolor paintings and charcoals.

== History ==
The Eagle Pencil Company was founded in 1856 in Yonkers, New York on John Street. After 5 years, Daniel Berolzheimer's son Henry purchased the city's first iron-framed building for the new factory. The company produced pens, pencils, pen holders and erasers. In 1897, the London branch confirmed the policy of selling manufactured goods with high quality. Over the years, the company changed focus and goods. In 1952, Margros Ltd was founded by Mr. P. G. Hooley, who invented Powdered Colour and sold it directly to schools. The business grew and the company was sold to Eagle Pencil Company in 1967.

The company which later became Osmiroid International was started in 1824 by James Perry who joined his brother in the pen‑making business. In 1989, the company was bought by Berol Ltd. The Newell Company joined forces with Berol on November 2, 1995. The merging of the two companies made Berol a branch of the Sanford Corporation.

== Products ==
Prismacolor offers a variety of colored pencils, markers, pastels, graphite pencils, and sets of each medium.

Colored pencil sketch of painter Ross Bleckner

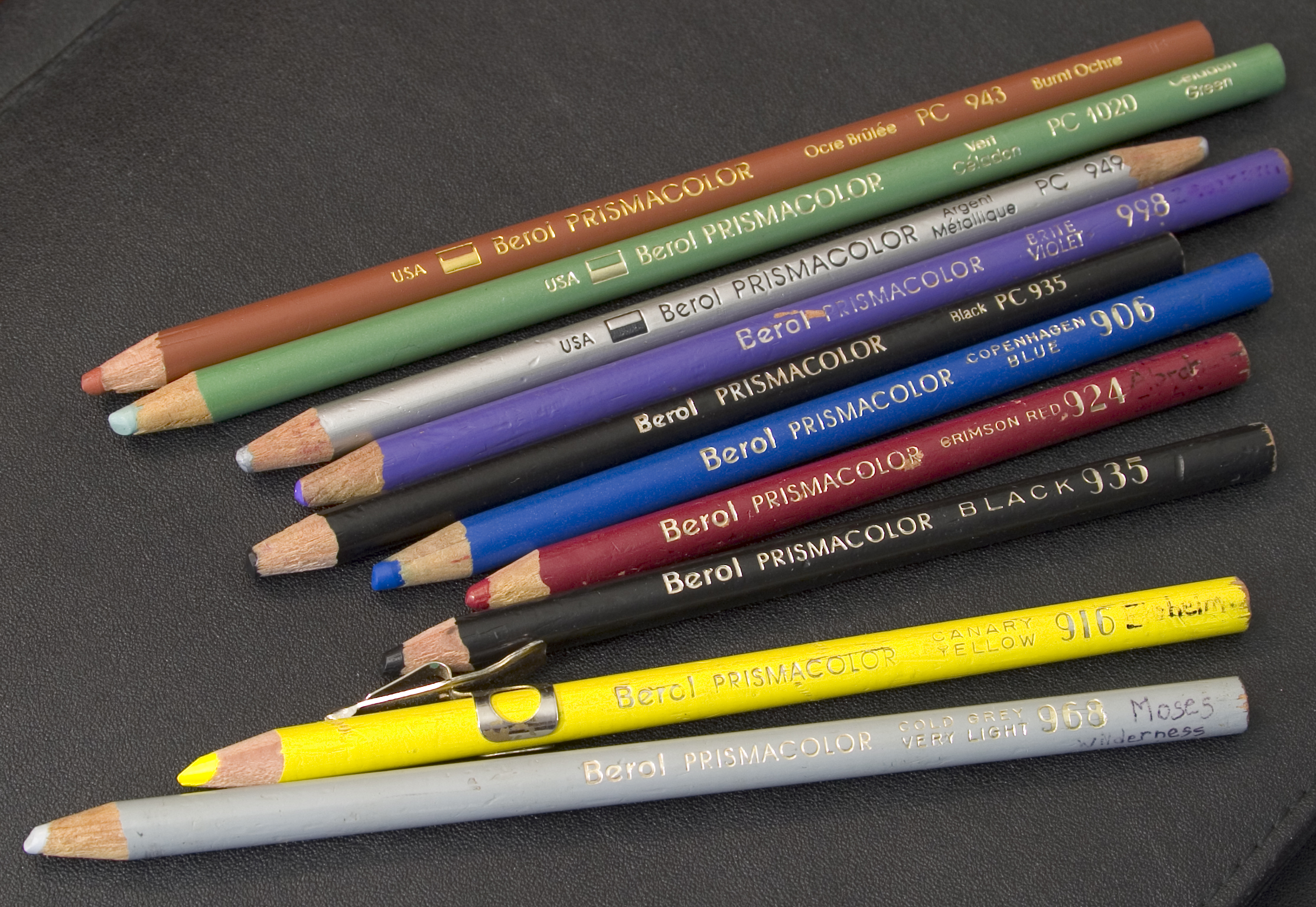
Berol Prismacolor pencils

Product	Range
Colored Pencils	Premier Col-Erase, Premier Verithin, Premier Water-Soluble, Premier Soft Core, Scholar
Markers	Premier Dual-Ended Fine Art, Premier Illustration
Graphite	Premier Ebony, Premier Turquoise, Scholar
Pastels	NuPastel Hard
