= VillaWare =

Kitchenware manufacturer

The first hand-crank pasta machine was invented in Cleveland by Angelo Vitantonio, an Italian immigrant in 1906, and went on to found the Italian kitchenware manufacturer VillaWare.

In 2003, VillaWare Manufacturing Company was merged with Tilia's Food Saver.

VillaWare today is owned by Newell Brands and is the brand name for their waffle maker, blender, food processor and panini grill.
