= Colored pencil =

Type of art medium

A variety of colored pencils

A colored pencil (American English), coloured pencil (Commonwealth English), colour pencil (Indian English), map pencil, pencil crayon, or coloured/colouring lead (Canadian English, Newfoundland English) is a type of pencil constructed of a narrow, pigmented core encased in a wooden cylindrical case. Unlike graphite and charcoal pencils, colored pencils' cores contain both wax- and oil- and varying proportions of pigments, additives, and binding agents. Water-soluble (watercolor) pencils and pastel pencils are also manufactured as well as colored cores for mechanical pencils.

Colored pencils are made in a wide range of price, quality and usability, from student-grade to professional-grade. Concentration of pigments in the core, type of wood encasing, lightfastness of the pigments, durability of the colored pencil, and softness of the core are some determinants of a brand's quality and, consequently, its market price. Colored pencils are commonly stored in pencil cases to prevent damage.

Despite colored pencils' existence for more than a century, the art world has historically treated the medium with less admiration than other art media. However, the discovery of new techniques and methods, the development of lightfast pencils, and the formation of authoritative organizations is better enabling colored pencils to compete with other media. Additionally, colored pencils are more affordable, cleaner, and simpler in use compared to other media.

The increasing popularity of colored pencils as an art medium led to the establishment of the Colored Pencil Society of America (CPSA) in the United States. Other countries such as the United Kingdom, Canada, Australia, Mexico, and several others have their own organizations and societies for colored pencil artists.

== History ==
The use of wax-based media in crayons can be traced back to the Greek Golden Age, and was later documented by Roman scholar Pliny the Elder. Wax-based materials have appealed to artists for centuries due to their resistance to decay, the vividness and brilliance of their colors, and their unique rendering qualities.

Although colored pencils had been used for "checking and marking" for decades prior, it was not until the early 20th century that artist-quality colored pencils were produced. Manufacturers that began producing artist-grade colored pencils included Faber-Castell in 1908 (the Polychromos range was initially 60 colors) and Caran d’Ache in 1924, followed by Berol Prismacolor in 1938. Other notable manufacturers include Bruynzeel-Sakura, Cretacolor, Derwent, Koh-i-Noor Hardtmuth, Mitsubishi (uni-ball), Schwan-Stabilo, and Staedtler.

== Types ==
Several types of colored pencils are manufactured for both artistic and practical uses.

=== Artist and professional-grade ===
Artist and professional-grade pencils are made with higher concentrations of high-quality pigments than student-grade colored pencils. Their lightfastness – resistance to UV rays in sunlight – is also measured and documented. Core durability, break and water resistance, and brand popularity are also notable features of artist-grade colored pencils. Artist-grade pencils have the largest color ranges; 72 color sets are very common and there are several brands of 120 colors or more. They are also typically available as individual pencils.

=== Student and scholastic-grade ===
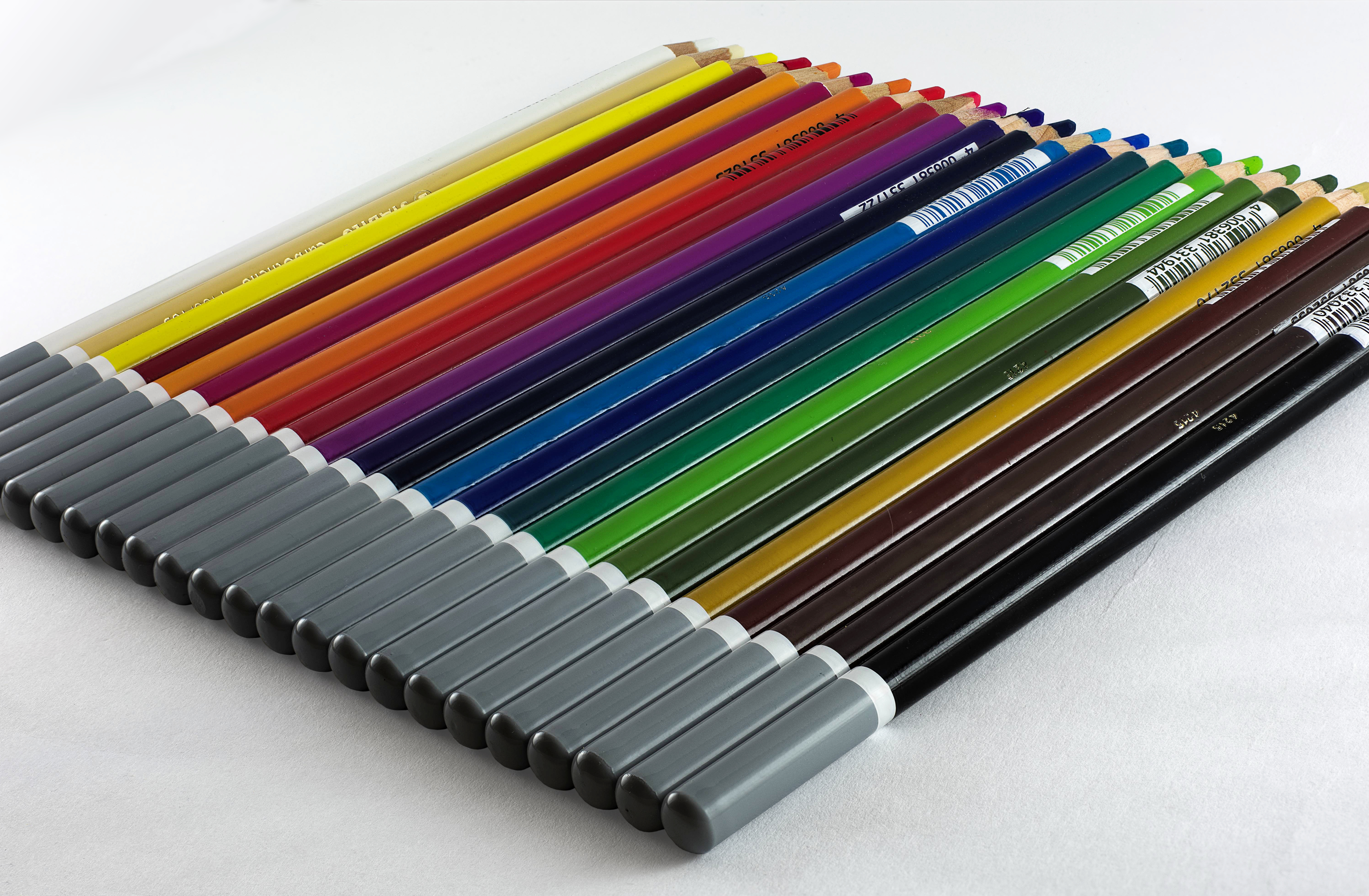
Colored pencils manufactured by Schwan-Stabilo

Many of the same companies that produce artist-grade colored pencils also offer student-grade materials and scholastic-level colored pencils. These products do not usually include a lightfastness rating, and core composition and pigment-binder ratio vary, even between products manufactured by the same company. Student- and scholastic-grade colored pencils lack the high quality pigments and lightfastness of artist-grade products, and their color range is smaller, often limited to 24 or 36 colors.

However, using lower-grade colored pencils does have some advantages. Some companies offer erasable colored pencils for beginning artists to experiment with. Student-grade colored pencils also tend to cost significantly less than their higher-grade counterparts, which makes them more accessible for children and students.

=== Watercolor pencils ===
Watercolor pencils, also known as water-soluble pencils, are a versatile art medium. They can be used dry like traditional colored pencils, or applied wet to create watercolor effects. In wet use, the artist lays down dry pigment and then uses a damp brush to intensify or spread the color. This technique can help blend colors, and many artists combine both dry and wet methods in a single piece. Artist-grade watercolor pencil sets commonly include 60 or 72 colors, with some professional sets offering up to 120 colors.

=== Oil-based ===
Oil-based pencils utilize an oil-based binder. The oil binder imparts unique characteristics such as a smoother finish, enhanced durability, and the ability to create fine details with less wax bloom compared to their wax-based counterparts. This composition facilitates superior blending and layering capabilities, allowing artists to achieve subtle color transitions and complex depths in their artwork. The pencils are known for their vibrant colors and are versatile enough for use on a variety of surfaces, making them a favorite among professionals for applications requiring precision and longevity.

=== Pastel pencils ===
Pastel pencils are similar to hard pastels. Pastel pencils can be used on their own or in combination with other mediums. They can be used dry, wet or blended together. Many artists use them for preliminary sketches, given that graphite pencils are not compatible with pastels. They can also be sharpened to a fine point to add details on pastel drawings.

== Techniques ==
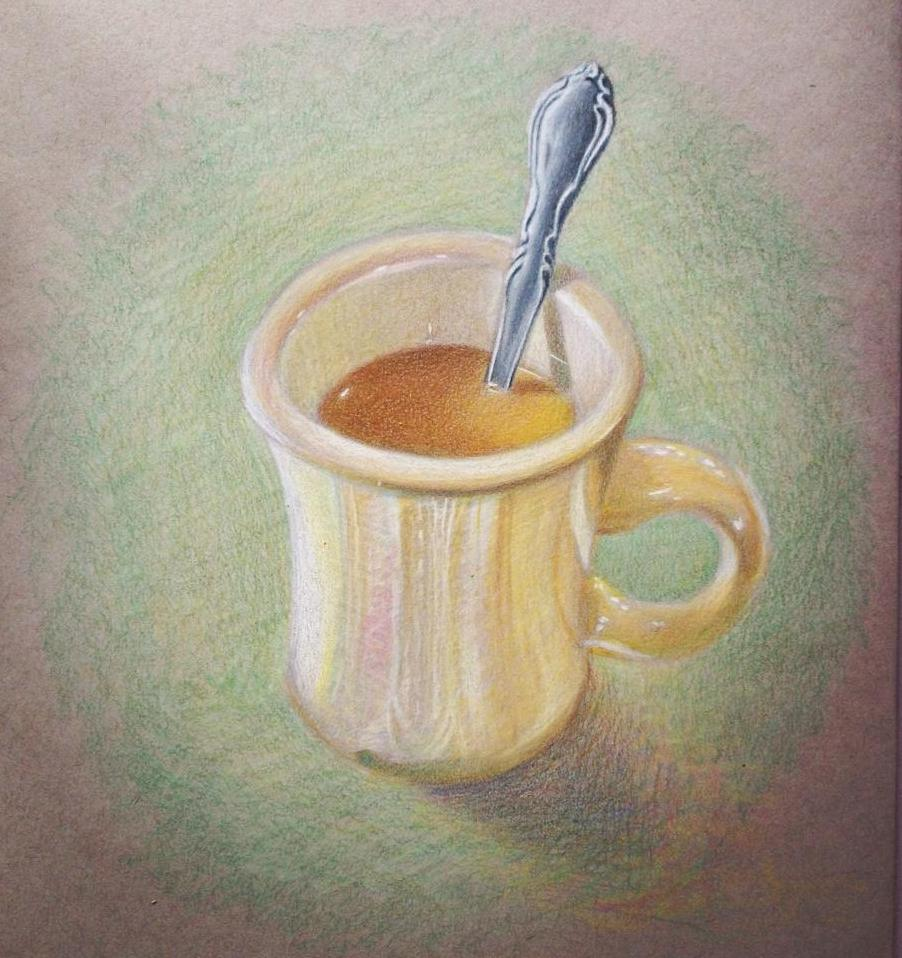
Colored pencil drawing displaying layering (mug) and burnishing (spoon) techniques

Colored pencils can be used in combination with several other drawing mediums. When used by themselves, there are two main rendering techniques colored pencil artists use.

- Layering is usually used in the beginning stages of a colored pencil drawing, but can also be used for entire pieces. In layering, tones are gradually built up using several layers of primary colors. Layered drawings usually expose the tooth of the paper and are characterized by a grainy, fuzzy finish.
- Burnishing is a blending technique in which a colorless blender or a light-colored pencil is applied firmly to an already layered drawing. This produces a shiny surface of blended colors that gets deep into the grain of the paper.
- Roughening is a technique, which creates a rendering of textured surfaces by placing a rough piece of paper underneath the drawing paper. Next, rub the drawing paper with a very smooth object to leave indentions on the paper. Finally, draw over it using colored pencil and the design should stand out.
- Scoring patterns can be used to create highlights on objects. The technique requires tracing or transparent paper and a sharp pen. First, place the paper over the area being impressed. Then, with moderate pressure, the desired line or pattern is used.
- Fusing colors encourages the colored pencil pigments to be physically blended using solvents, colorless blender, or a combination of both of these. This technique enables the colors to easily mix into a single color.

== See also ==
- Blue pencil (editing)
- List of art media
- List of pen types, brands and companies
