= Graco (baby products) =

American baby products company

Graco Children's Products Inc.
- Company type: Subsidiary
- Founded: 1942; 84 years ago
- Founder: Russell Gray; Robert Cone
- Headquarters: Philadelphia, Pennsylvania, United States
- Area served: Worldwide
- Key people: Chris Peterson, CEO
- Products: Baby products
- Parent: Newell Brands
- Website: www.gracobaby.com

Previous logo variant

Graco Children's Products Inc. (pronounced gray-co) is an American baby products company based in High Point, North Carolina. It is owned and operated by Newell Brands. Graco offers products including car seats, travel systems, strollers, high chairs, play yards, and baby swings.

== History ==
Graco was founded in 1942 in Philadelphia, Pennsylvania, by Russell Gray and Robert Cone (hence the name) as Graco Metal Products, a company that fabricated machine and car parts. Rex Thomas (one of two engineers hired to come up with a sustainable product) watched his wife sitting on the porch, rocking their baby in a swing with a string tied to it, while she read a book. Rex went into work the next day and said "why don't we make an automatic baby swing." After 18 months of research and development, the Swyngomatic - the world's first wind-up, automatic baby swing was born in 1955, designed by company engineer Dave Saint.

In 1987, the company pioneered the invention of the Pack N' Play Portable Playard, the world's first portable play yard (designed by Nate Saint, Dave Saint's son).

In 1998, Rubbermaid acquired Century, a car seat manufacturer and introduced the SnugRide infant car seat, which has become America's top-selling infant car seat line. Century actually introduced the travel system where a car seat could fit on a stroller for easy transportation. That same year, Graco was acquired by Rubbermaid. A year later in 1999, the company was acquired by Newell Company and Newell became Newell Rubbermaid.

In 2016, Newell Rubbermaid changed its name to Newell Brands when they acquired Jarden.

In 2002, Graco launched the Turbo Booster, a booster seat designed to help parents stay in compliance with many states' passage of laws requiring children to stay in a car seat longer. In 2007, the company purchased established German baby product brand, Teutonia. The same year, the Nautilus 3-in-1 car seat debuted, earning the "Best Bet" designation from Insurance Institute for Highway Safety. Then, in 2008, Graco acquired Aprica Kassai, the number one selling baby brand in Japan. In 2014, Newell Rubbermaid acquired American baby brand, Baby Jogger.

In 2021, Graco raised the minimum weight requirements for its boosters after a scathing Propublica report and Congressional subcommittee investigation.
