= Dometic Group =

Swedish mobile appliance manufacturer

- Type: Public (Aktiebolag)
- Traded as: Nasdaq Stockholm: DOM
- Industry: Consumer Products and Services
- Founded: 2001; 25 years ago
- Headquarters: Solna, Stockholm, Sweden
- Area served: Worldwide
- Key people: Juan Vargues (President and CEO), Fredrik Cappelen (Chairman)
- Products: Products for the leisure market. e.g. portable refrigerators, coolers, grills, air conditioning systems, tents, batteries, marine steering systems and solar energy solutions.
- Brands: igloocoolers.com waeco.com/en/ kampaoutdoors.com
- Revenue: SEK 21 billion (2025)
- Operating income: SEK 2.22 billion (2025)
- Number of employees: 7,000 (2025)
- Subsidiaries: igloocoolers.com
- Website: dometic.com dometicgroup.com

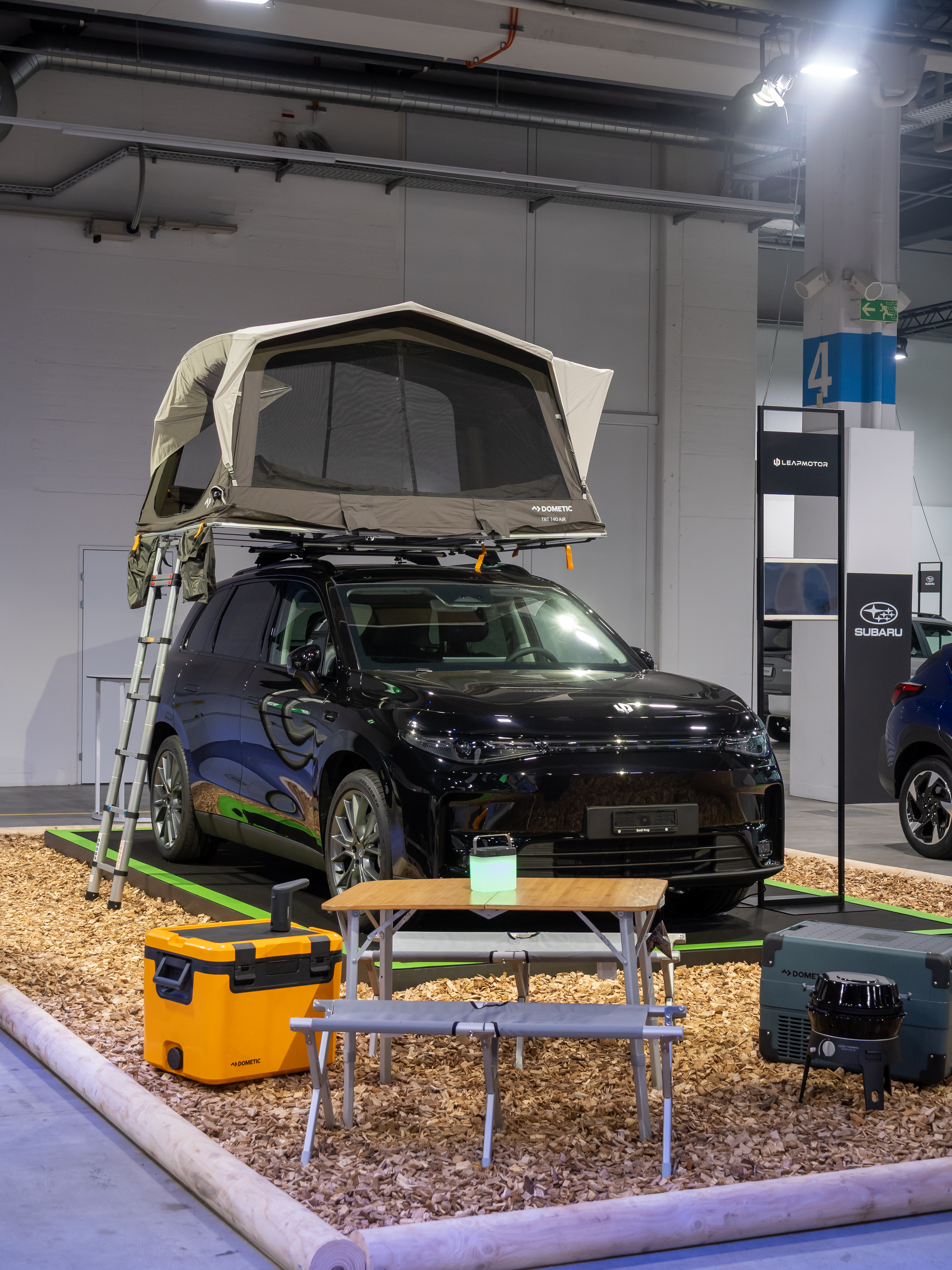
Dometic roof tent

Dometic Group is a Swedish company that manufactures a variety of products, notably for the outdoor, recreational vehicle, marine, and hospitality industries in the areas of Food & Beverage, Climate, Power & Control, and other applications. It operates in the Americas, EMEA and Asia Pacific.

Dometic sells its products in approximately 100 countries and has a global distribution and dealer network in place to serve the aftermarket. Dometic employs approximately 7,000 people worldwide, had net sales of SEK 21 billion in 2025 and is headquartered in Solna, Sweden.

In November 2015, the company went public through an IPO on Nasdaq Stockholm.

The company was founded in 2001 and has its headquarters in Solna, Stockholm, Sweden, though its roots lay further back in the 1920s.
