= Berol =

British stationery brand

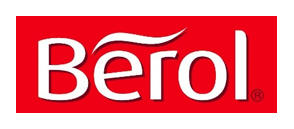
- Formerly: Eagle Pencil Company (1856–1969); Berol Corporation (1969–2010)
- Type: Privately held company (1856–1995); Subsidiary (1995–2010); Brand (2010–present)
- Industry: Stationery
- Founded: 1856
- Founder: Daniel Berolzheimer
- Defunct: 2010; 16 years ago
- Fate: Company acquired by Newell Rubbermaid in 1995, then closed in 2010. Berol survived as a brand.
- Headquarters: Lichfield, England
- Products: Writing implements, art materials
- Owner: Newell Brands (2010)

Berol (stylised as Bẽrol) is a British stationery brand of Newell Brands and former stationery manufacturing company, based in Lichfield, Staffordshire. The company was established in 1856 and manufactured a wide range of products including writing implements and art materials. It was acquired by Sanford L.P. in 1995, a division of Newell Brands, becoming a subsidiary of it until the last factory closed in 2010. Since then, Berol has survived as a brand of imported products, though the head office remains in Lichfield.

Berol's product lines included art materials such as acrylics, pastels, oil pastels, inks, crayons, adhesives, and other mediums; while the writing instruments line composed of pencils, colored pencils, pens, and markers, plus accessories.

== History ==
The "Eagle Pencil Company" was founded by Franconian immigrant Daniel Berolzheimer from Fürth in 1856 opening a pencil shop in New York City and a factory in Yonkers. The company extended its business opening office, warehouse, and showrooms in London in 1894.

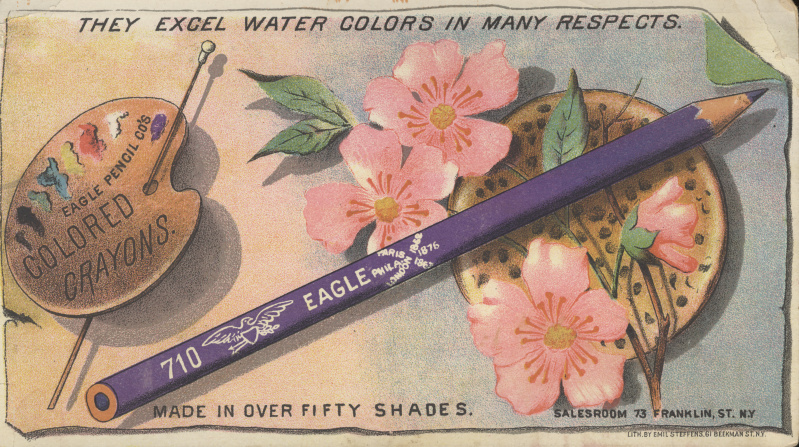
Eagle Pencil Co. ad, c. 1900

Eagle Pencil also opened a factory in Tottenham, that started operating towards the end of 1907. The outbreak of the World War II in 1939 saw the factory pause pencil manufacture and instead produce secret military equipment. Pencil manufacture recommenced in 1946.

The company opened a purpose built factory on the Hardwick Industrial Estate in King's Lynn, Norfolk in 1967. A series of post-war corporate acquisitions meant that the Eagle Pencil name was no longer appropriate and the company name was changed to "Berol" in 1969, taking the owner's now-shortened surname. Berol's head office remained at the Tottenham factory until the need for extra production space prompted a move to Whetstone, London, and then to King's Lynn in 1978.

Chairman Kenneth Berol announced the family's intention to sell the company in 1986 as there was no sixth generation family successor. The following year, it was acquired by the Empire Pencil Corporation of Tennessee.

The company decided to close the Tottenham factory in February 1992, and moved some production to King's Lynn. Newell Company acquired the Berol Corporation in 1995, being placed in its Sanford division.

The King's Lynn factory closed in 2003 with 230 redundancies. Some production was transferred to the Lichfield, Staffordshire factory, and the former Parker Pen factory in Newhaven, Sussex, but the factory was closed in 2010. From then on, all products under the name "Berol" were imported goods. The Lichfield factory is now the UK address for the Newell Group.

== Products ==
During the 1980s, Berol secured a contract to supply the BBC with standard writing instruments as well as a broad range of promotional pens, highlighters, and permanent markers.
