= Food storage container =

Receptacle for storing food

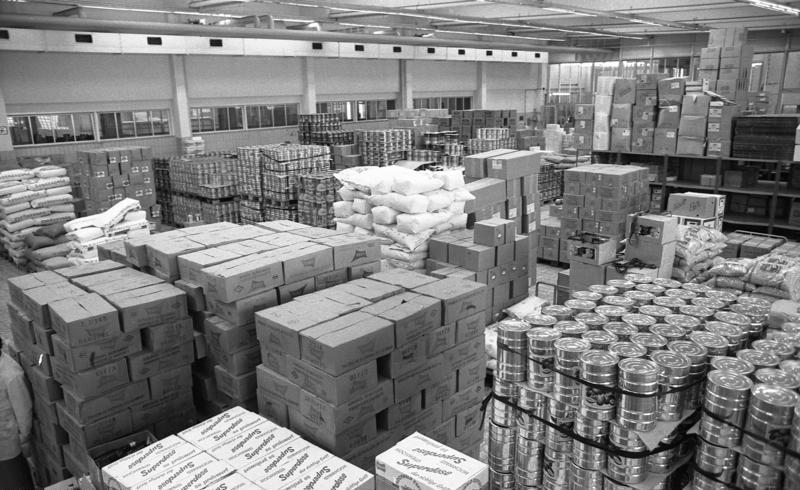
Warehouse storing many kinds of food

Consumer pantry, also diverse

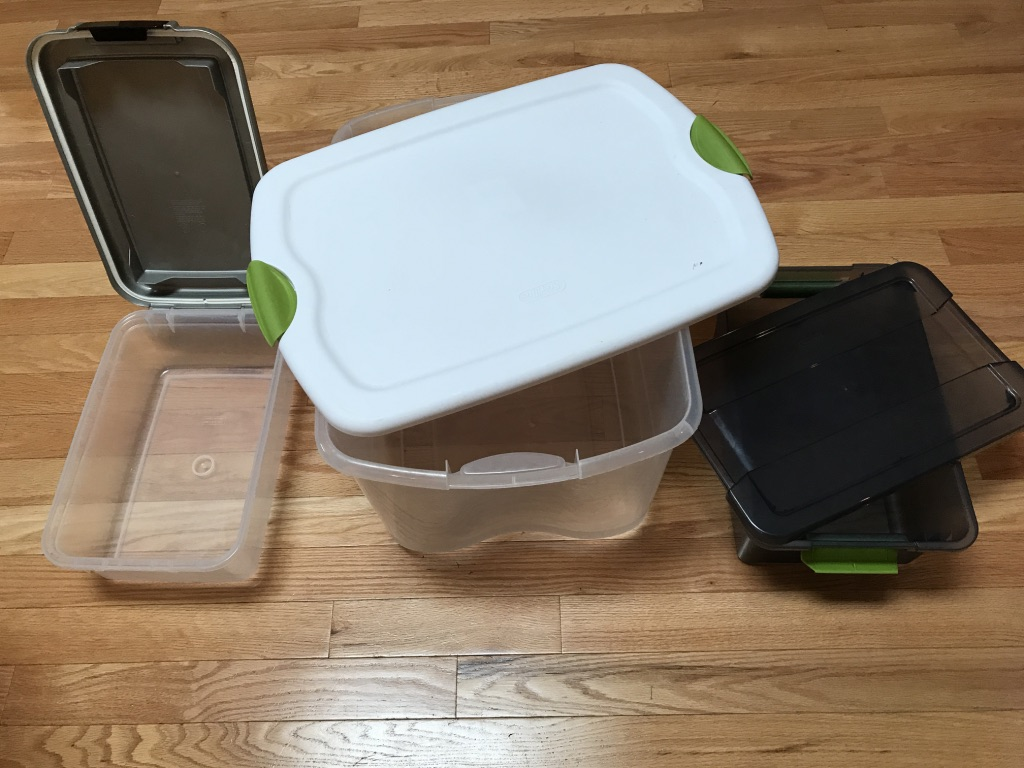
Home storage containers with latched lids

Food storage containers are widespread in use throughout the world and have probably been in use since the first human civilizations.

== History ==
=== Early civilizations ===
In early civilizations cereal grains such as maize, wheat, barley etc. were stored in large airy buildings, often raised up from the ground to reduce infestation by pests and vermin. Ancient Egyptian and early Hebrew writings include reference to such buildings and their successors can still be seen in use in less developed countries and regions.

Smaller quantities of food were stored in baskets made from woven grasses or leaves and such designs have remained in use to the present day.

In Afghanistan, rural farmers have for hundreds of years maintained a technique of storing fresh grapes in mud-straw containers called kangina.

In more recent times but prior to the invention of the refrigerator many food products were stored in the home as preserves or pickles, often in heat sealed jars such as Kilner jars

== Modern containers ==
In the modern developed world, a very wide range of food packaging and containers is now available made from many materials.

Plastic containers

Many products use low-density polyethylene formed into plastic bags or plastic boxes. There are many makers of plastic boxes some such as Tupperware and Lock & Lock are known throughout much of the developed world.

Metal containers

Longer-term storage or storage of items needing a higher degree of protection from the elements may use sheet metal. A common form of such storage is the biscuit tin. See Canning.

Refrigerator

Perhaps the most ubiquitous domestic item of food storage is the fridge or fridge-freezer in which a wide variety of foodstuffs are contained and preserved through the use of low temperatures.

Disposable

Disposable food containers, a form of disposable food packaging, may be used for food or beverages. Disposable containers are often made of paper or paperboard, plastic (including plastic foam), or aluminum.

== Industrial food storage containers ==
Wherever food is harvested, manufactured or distributed there is a need for containers to enable the food to travel securely and in good condition to the shop, warehouse or distribution depot. For many foods, especially those in their own individual containers such as canned vegetables, the common container is the corrugated fiberboard box, Corrugated boxes are available in many sizes.

A variety of bulk boxes are also used.

== See also ==
- Food storage
- Reusable packaging
- Gastronorm, a European standard for food container sizes, both for cooking and storage
- Shaker-style pantry box
