= Lock & Lock =

South Korean household products company

- Type: Public limited company
- Traded as: KRX: 115390
- Founded: 11 November 1978
- Headquarters: South Korea
- Area served: Worldwide
- Products: Food storage, cookware, kitchenware, outdoorware and others
- Revenue: around US$418 million (2021)

Lock & Lock (Korean: 락앤락) is a household products company headquartered in Seoul, South Korea. Since its establishment in 1978, Lock & Lock has been exporting products to 119 countries.

In addition, the company has 11 overseas sales units including in Germany, United States, China, Vietnam, and 87 overseas directly operated stores in the world.

== Factories ==
- Vũng Tàu, Vietnam (plastic/glass/cookware)
- Manshan, Suzhou, China
