= Penny debate in the United States =

Potential abolition of the United States penny

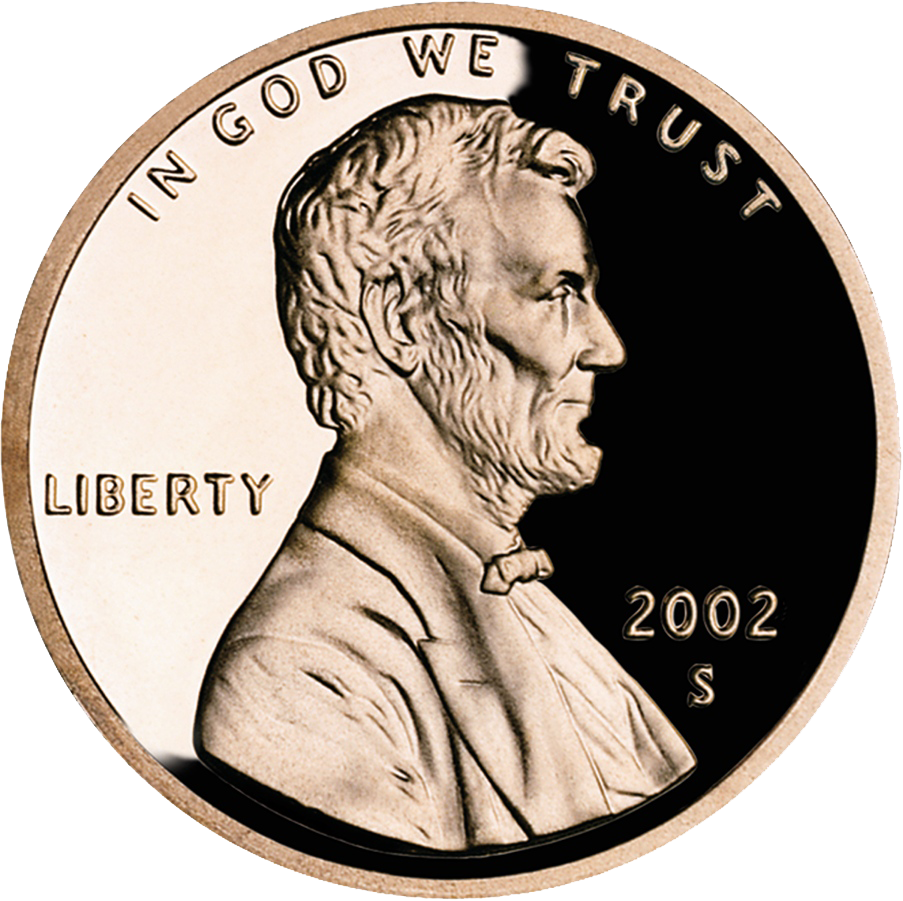
A proof-quality penny

A debate has existed within the United States government and American society at large over whether the one-cent coin, the penny, should be eliminated as a unit of currency in the United States. The penny remains in circulation but has not been produced for circulation since 2025. The penny costs more to produce than the one cent it is worth, meaning its seigniorage is negative – the government loses money on every penny that is created.

In November 2025, following a February 2025 order from President Donald Trump, the U.S. Treasury halted the production of pennies for circulation, while continuing to mint uncirculated pennies for collectors. However, the coin remains legal tender and in circulation, as only an act of Congress can eliminate forms of currency.

Following the end of circulating penny production, the Federal Reserve stopped handling pennies at most of its terminals, leading to regional penny shortages. Some affected businesses began rounding cash transactions to the nearest five cents when pennies were unavailable. The Federal Reserve reversed its decision in January 2026, easing the shortages. However, with no new pennies produced for circulation, penny circulation is expected to gradually decrease over time.

In September 2026, the Common Cents Act, which mandates the government to permanently cease minting pennies for circulation but allows for the continued production of uncirculated pennies, passed Congress. The Common Cents Act permits businesses to round cash payments to the nearest five cents, but only if pennies are unavailable.

While the Common Cents Act does not mandate cash rounding nor remove the penny from circulation, several bills have been introduced in Congress since 1990 to mandate cash rounding and thus withdraw the penny from circulation. Such bills, all of which have died in Congress, would leave the five-cent coin (nickel) as the lowest-value circulating coin in the United States.

Other countries have also withdrawn coins no longer worth producing, such as Canada withdrawing its penny from circulation in 2013. The most recent time that the United States withdrew its lowest-value coin from circulation was with the half-cent coin (ha'penny) in 1857, at which time the coin was worth approximately 17 cents in 2025 dollars. (Note: Many other non-lowest denominations have since been withdrawn from circulation, from the two-cent coin in 1872 to the $10,000 bill in 1969; see Obsolete denominations of United States currency.)

== Reasons ==
The principal argument for discontinuing the penny is cost: the cost of minting the coin keeps rising, while inflation diminishes its face value. As time passes, the Treasury loses money on producing the coins. Inflation is the reason for the second argument: the coin's value is so small that it is essentially useless in transactions. The argument against discontinuance revolve around tradition and fear that without the penny, prices will be increased to the next-higher five-cent multiple.

Pennies were long minted of a copper-based alloy, but as the price of copper rose, the cost of the metal became prohibitive. In 1982, the Mint switched to a zinc-based alloy, retaining enough copper to give the coins their traditional color. Metal prices continued to rise, and by 2006, the cost of minting a penny exceeded its face value, reigniting the debate. By 2024, the cost to mint a cent was 3.69 cents.

Numerous legislative proposals to discontinue the penny were made, but public opinion remained in favor of the coin. Polling in November 2025 found that 42% of Americans opposed removing pennies from circulation, with 34% in favor.

== Proposed legislation ==
In 1990, United States representative Jim Kolbe (R-Ariz.) introduced the Price Rounding Act of 1989, H.R. 3761, to eliminate the penny in cash transactions, rounding to the nearest nickel. In 2001, Kolbe introduced the Legal Tender Modernization Act of 2001, H.R. 2528, and in 2006, he introduced the Currency Overhaul for an Industrious Nation (C.O.I.N.) Act, H.R. 5818. While the bills received much popular support from the public, all failed to become law. Kolbe responded to criticism that the rounding system would increase prices that could hurt the consumer and stated that it "favors neither the consumer nor the retailer because the probability of rounding up or down is 50 percent either way – it would all come out even in the end."

In 2017, senators John McCain (R-Ariz.) and Mike Enzi (R-Wyo.) introduced S. 759, the Currency Optimization, Innovation, and National Savings (C.O.I.N.S.) Act of 2017, that would have stopped minting of the penny for general circulation for 10 years and studied the question of whether production would cease thereafter. The bill died at the end of the 115th Congress with no hearings held by the Senate Committee on Banking, Housing, and Urban Affairs.

On April 30, 2025, representatives Lisa McClain (R-Mich.) and Robert Garcia (D-Cal.) introduced the Common Cents Act, H.R. 3074, a bill to formalize an end to penny production for general circulation and permit cash transactions to be rounded to the nearest nickel. The House of Representatives passed the Common Cents Act on July 14, 2026; the Senate passed its version of the bill on August 7, and the House must pass the Senate-approved version of the bill to send it to the president. On September 28, 2026, Congress passed the Common Cents Act, sending it to Donald Trump, who as of September 29, 2026 is expected to sign it.

== 2025 production halt ==
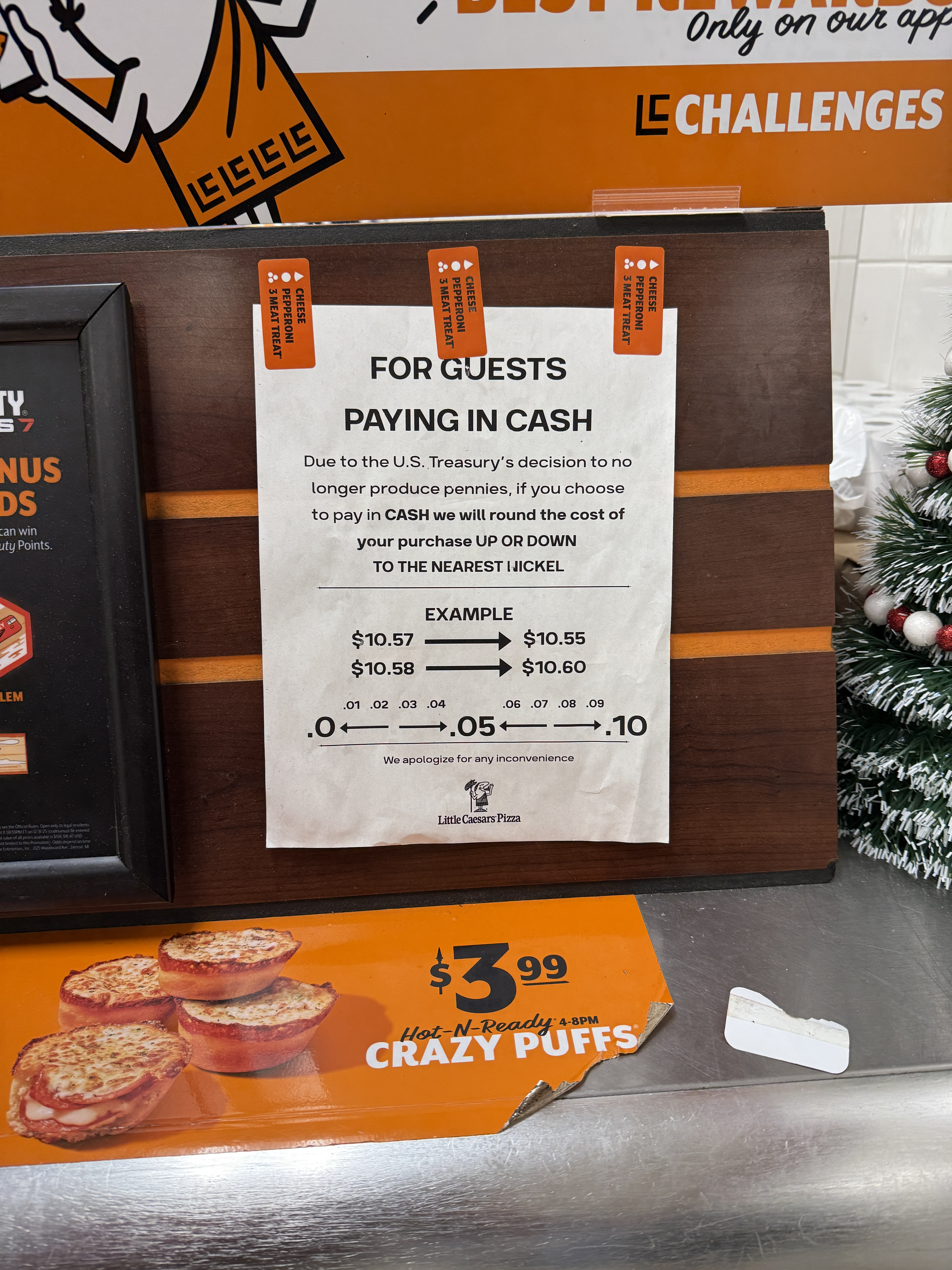
A cash rounding notice at a Little Caesars in North Carolina in December 2025

On February 9, 2025, President Donald Trump said he had ordered the Treasury secretary, Scott Bessent, to stop producing new pennies, a move that he said would help reduce unnecessary government spending. While it is Congress that authorizes the Treasury regarding what coins to mint, the Treasury secretary has the authority to mint coins in amounts they deem necessary. Trump's move has been received with general approval, including from Colorado governor Jared Polis, a Democrat who has been pushing to get rid of the penny since before Trump's inauguration. On May 22, 2025, the Treasury announced that the Mint had stopped purchasing penny planchets; production would cease at their exhaustion. After a slowdown in the summer, penny production for general circulation was halted on November 12, 2025, with penny production continuing for collector sets and commemorative purposes.

By mid-November 2025, the Federal Reserve had stopped handling pennies at over half its terminals, but this decision was reversed in January 2026. The closures exacerbated regional penny shortages. Businesses affected have adopted differing responses, such as requiring payment in exact change or rounding cash transactions to the nearest five cents. Still, there are no federal regulations on rounding cash transactions, and several cities require exact change to be given. Amid potential confusion among stakeholders, some states have provided recommendations for rounding or have considered legislation. As of July 2026, 20 states have enacted legislation permitting businesses to round cash transactions when pennies are unavailable; Arizona is the only state with mandatory cash rounding when pennies are unavailable.

== Arguments ==
=== Production and distribution costs ===
==== Production at a loss ====
In 2024, the US mint produced 3,225,200,000 pennies at a cost of 3.69 cents per penny, which resulted in an annual loss to taxpayers of $85.3 million. Further, as the price of the raw materials from which the penny is made exceeds the face value, there is a risk that coins will be illegally melted down for raw materials.

==== Increased cost ====
Commissioned by Jarden Zinc, which supplies zinc "penny blanks" to the Mint, a 2012 report conducted by Navigant Consulting found that the government would lose money without the penny. According to the industry's front group Americans for Common Cents' website, "First, the Mint's fabrication and distribution costs include fixed components that will continue to be incurred whether or not the Mint produces the penny. Navigant estimates this fixed component at $13 million in FY 2011. Plus, there is $17.7 million in Mint overhead allocated to the penny that would have to be absorbed by the remaining denominations of circulating coins without the penny. Second, under current Mint accounting, the nickel costs eleven cents to manufacture. In a scenario where nickel production doubled without the penny, Navigant concludes that with existing fixed costs, eliminating the penny would likely result in increased net costs to the Mint of $10.9 million, relative to the current state."

==== Effort to transport and count ====
In 2024, 57.5% of coins minted were pennies. These 3.2 billion pennies at 2.5 g each had a combined weight of 8,000 t (8,818 short tons), and were transported by secure and therefore expensive means from the Mint to banks and then on to stores. Store employees spend valuable time counting low-value pennies at the end of a work shift. Banks often return loose coins in an armored truck to be sorted and wrapped so as to be ready to be given out to customers. This process costs on the order of 10 cents per roll (a 20 percent charge on a roll of 50 pennies).

=== Limited utility of pennies ===
==== Lost productivity and opportunity cost of use ====
With the median wage in the US being $23.80 per hour in 2024, it takes 1.5 seconds of work to earn one cent. Thus pennies are discarded or avoided as their value is minimal compared to the time to count, use, and manage them.

==== Limited utility ====
Pennies are not accepted by most vending machines, or by most toll booths, and are generally not accepted in bulk. Economist Greg Mankiw says that "The purpose of the monetary system is to facilitate exchange, but ... the penny no longer serves that purpose." Pennies often drop out of circulation (for example, they are stored in jars at home) and due to their low value are sometimes even thrown away. This contributes to the need for the United States Mint to produce more pennies than all other coins, accounting for 57.5% of all coin production in 2024.

==== Public preference for cashless transactions ====
According to a 2025 Federal Reserve study, cash transactions in 2024 dropped to only 14% of transactions. Persons aged 55 and older used cash for 19% of transactions, while those aged 18–24 used cash for only 10%.

=== Effect on prices ===
==== Prices would not be higher ====
Research by economics professor Robert Whaples in 2007, using data on nearly 200,000 transactions from a multi-state convenience store chain shows, that rounding would have virtually no effect. On average, consumers would gain a tiny amount – about 0.025 ¢ per transaction.

==== Elimination would not hurt the poor ====
Given that rounding (based on cash transaction totals being rounded up and down to the nearest multiple of five cents) is neutral at the transaction level, and that cash transactions are faster without having to deal with extremely low-value coins, people who disproportionately deal in cash transactions would be helped more by elimination of the penny. To gain consumer favor for reducing the use of the penny it could be legislated (either on a state or federal level) that all cash transactions totals over a nominal amount (say 25 cents) would need to be rounded down to the nearest multiple of five cents. Rounding down cash transaction totals is a win for the merchant too as it encourages cash sales and thereby avoids the electronic payment fee (typically on the order of two percent of the balance).

=== Public opinion ===
According to a national survey conducted in January 2017 by the polling team of Hart Research Associates and Public Opinion Strategies on behalf of the Dollar Coin Alliance, there is broad support for eliminating the penny, finding that 77 percent of voters support suspending production of the penny. When told of the savings made by suspending the penny, support jumped to 84 percent. The debate was featured on an episode of The West Wing in 2001, as several news outlets recalled in the context of the debate in 2025.

=== Historical precedents ===
There has never been a coin in circulation in the U.S. worth as little as the penny was worth in 2025, although other countries have coins with less purchasing power in circulation. Because of inflation, one nickel in 2025 has parity in value to a penny in 1978, and a dime in 2025 has parity in value to a penny in 1967.

=== Environmental and health hazards ===
Zinc can cause anemia or gastric ulceration in babies that inadvertently ingest pennies made after 1982. A single penny can kill a pet. Also, the mining of zinc and copper causes toxic pollution and is especially undesirable when considering the valuable metals being used to produce a coin with little utility.

== Nickels ==
A related debate exists for the nickel. As of 2024, nickels cost $0.1378 per coin to produce and distribute, providing an argument for elimination similar to the penny's production at a loss. The 2024 production of nickels was 112,800,000, resulting in an annual loss to taxpayers of $17.7 million. In 1857, when the half cent was eliminated, the one cent coin became the lowest denomination in circulation. Today, the face value of the nickel is well below what that penny represented at the time, underscoring how much the value of modern US coinage has diminished in comparison to historical standards.

== Lobbying ==
- The coin lobby Citizens to Retire the Penny support the elimination of the United States one-cent coin.
- The Coin Coalition of vending machine manufacturers, arcade owners, and soft drink companies supports eliminating the penny and the paper dollar bill.
- The sole provider of zinc "penny blanks", Jarden Zinc Products of Greeneville, Tennessee, has hired lobbyists to make the case for preserving the penny and their sales. In 2011 $140,000 in retention fees were paid to Americans for Common Cents for its lobbying efforts on behalf of Jarden Zinc who received a $48 million government contract later that same year.
- Americans for Common Cents is a non-profit lobbying group dedicated to the protection of the one-cent coin. The group is primarily interested in preserving the penny for economic and historical reasons. In 2012, Executive Director Mark Weller was paid $340,000 by Jarden Zinc to discuss issues relating to minting with members of Congress and the US Mint. Weller has acknowledged this funding, saying that "We make no secret that one of our major sponsors is a company that makes the zinc 'blanks' for pennies." Weller has testified on multiple occasions before Congress. In 2020 Weller testified that the use of cash protects privacy, provides economic stability and "is a public good" that should not be replaced by mobile money.

== Other options ==
Economist François R. Velde suggested in 2007 that the government make the penny worth five cents. This change would add about $6 billion to the money supply.

Congress passed the Coin Modernization, Oversight, and Continuity Act of 2010, which requires the Treasury to report on possible new metallic coin materials. In the 2014 Biennial Report, Appendix 4, the Mint reported that the previous study had "found that there was no more-cost-effective alternative material for the one-cent", and thus recommended that it continued its current mix of copper and zinc.

== Precedents in other countries ==
Many countries outside the United States have chosen to remove low-value coins from circulation:

- Australia discontinued one-cent coins in 1990 and two-cent coins of the Australian dollar in 1989 due to the metal exceeding face value. They were fully withdrawn from circulation in 1992.
- Until 2012, Canada minted a one-cent coin of similar size and color to its American counterpart, with steel as the interior metal instead of zinc, though composition was near identical to US cents prior to 2000 and so it circulates at par in small quantities in the United States (and vice versa). However, on March 29, 2012, the Canadian government announced that it would eliminate the penny from its coinage system. The final Canadian penny was minted on May 4, 2012, and active distribution of the coin by the mint was discontinued on February 4, 2013. Since that date, businesses were encouraged to begin rounding cash transactions only to the nearest five-cent increment. Checks and transactions using electronic payments – debit, credit and payments cards – are not rounded.
- Indonesia demonetized its 10-rupiah coins on November 15, 1996, and 25 rupiah coins on August 31, 2010; it had also stopped producing 50 rupiah coins in 2003.
- Mexico's new peso transition in 1993 made the five-centavo coin the smallest denomination of the new currency. In 2009, new coins were minted only for the 10, 20 and 50 centavo denominations.
- New Zealand eliminated one- and two-cent coins of the New Zealand dollar in April 1990, and the five-cent coin in October 2006.
- At US military bases overseas, AAFES rounds up or down to the nearest one-twentieth denomination of currency.
- Sweden's smallest circulating coin is the SEK 1 coin, worth around US$0.11.

However, many nations still use coins of similar or smaller value to the United States cent. In some cases, while the nominal value of the coin may be smaller than that of a US cent, the purchasing power may be higher:

- South Korea stopped minting ₩1 and ₩5 coins, but ₩10 coins (worth about US$0.01) are still minted with changing composition and used only in supermarkets.
- Some countries in the Eurozone use one and two-cent coins. As posted prices generally include taxes, it is possible (but not standard) for vendors to round prices to the nearest five cents and eliminate the need for smaller-value coins. However, Finland, Ireland and the Netherlands have abandoned the use of one- and two-cent coins altogether, with the lowest-value coin in use being the five-cent coin. Finland only ever produced a small number of one-cent coins, mostly for collecting and legal reasons.
- Panama and Ecuador, which use the United States dollar as their currency, mint their own coins including one-centavo pieces identical in size to the penny. However, prices and wages are generally lower in those countries than in the United States.

== Laws regarding melting and export ==
On April 17, 2007, a Department of the Treasury regulation went into effect prohibiting the treatment, melting, or mass export of pennies and nickels. Exceptions were allowed for numismatists, jewelry makers, and normal tourism demands. The reason given was that the price of copper was rising to the point where these coins could be profitably melted for their metal content. In 1969, a similar law regarding silver coinage was repealed. Because their silver content frequently exceeds collector value, silver coins are often sold by multiplying their "face value" times a benchmark price that floats relative to the spot silver price per ounce. According to American law, US citizens are allowed to melt foreign coinage (e.g., Canadian pennies) for personal or commercial use; however, by doing so they are usually violating the laws of the country that issued the coinage in question.

== See also ==
- Debasement
- Gresham's law
- Inflation
- Inflationism
- Inflation hedge
- Metal theft
- Take a penny, leave a penny
- Withdrawal of low-denomination coins
