= Rival (consumer products company) =

American home appliance manufacturer

The Rival Company
- Type: Subsidiary
- Industry: Consumer products company
- Founded: 1932; 94 years ago
- Area served: Worldwide
- Products: Home appliances
- Parent: Newell Brands
- Website: www.rivalproducts.com

The Rival Company is a manufacturer of small appliances that produces products under the Bionaire, Crock-Pot, Fasco, Patton, Pollenex, Rival, Simer, and White Mountain brands. It became a wholly owned subsidiary of Holmes Products Corp. in 1999, and later became a brand of Sunbeam Products, a subsidiary of Jarden Corporation, which purchased Holmes in 2005. Jarden, in turn, merged with Newell Rubbermaid in 2016. It is now part of the Newell Brands company.

== History ==
Rival was founded in Kansas City, Missouri, in 1932 by Henry J. Talge as the Rival Manufacturing Co., which specialized in die casting. It soon began producing food preparation products under the "O-Mat" line, such as the Juice-O-Mat juicer, Can-O-Mat can opener, and Broil-O-Mat broiler. After shutting down their consumer lines during World War II to produce tools for North American Aviation and ammunition and switches for the United States Navy, Rival expanded their product lines in the post-war era. They acquired Waverly Products, Inc., in 1948, expanding their products into the home appliances market with Waverly's popular Steam-O-Matic iron.

In 1963, the company was sold to Stern Brothers Investment Bank for $6.3 million, and went public in 1964. Soon after, they acquired Titan Manufacturing Company and their line of portable electric heaters. In 1970, they acquired the Chicago-based Naxon Utilities Corp., makers of a little-known product called the "Bean-Pot" slow cooker. Rival re-introduced the Bean Pot as the Crock-Pot in 1971, along with a book of slow-cooker recipes, and it quickly became one of their top products.

Rival went private again in 1986, but became a publicly traded company again in 1992 after a failed attempt in 1990. After going public again, they acquired the Simer Pump Company, Pollenex Corp, White Mountain Freezers, Patton Electric Company, Inc., Fasco Consumer Products, and Bionaire, Inc. during the 1990s. In November 1996 Rival purchased the remnants of Dazey Products Company and their "Seal-A-Meal" and "Food Saver" products.

In February 1999, Rival was acquired by Holmes Products Corp, a manufacturer of air handling products such as fans, heaters, humidifiers, and filters (markets in which Rival was also a major player).

Holmes continued to best known for Rival's products marketed under the "Rival", "Crock-Pot, and Bionaire" brand names until they were acquired by Jarden Corporation in 2005. Jarden's Sunbeam Products, Inc. subsidiary continued to manufacture products under the Rival and Holmes brands, although Crock-Pot was spun off as its own brand and its slow cookers no longer feature the Rival logo, and Bionaire and Patton have become Jarden subsidiaries. The "Rival" brand name and logo are also licensed by Walmart for some of their store brand small appliances.

In 2016, Newell Rubbermaid acquired Jarden and became Newell Brands.
