= Jarden =

American consumer products manufacturer

Jarden Corporation
- Type: Subsidiary
- Industry: Consumer goods
- Founded: April 1993 (as Alltrista)
- Founder: Martin E. Franklin
- Defunct: April 15, 2016
- Fate: Acquired by Newell Rubbermaid
- Headquarters: Rye, New York, United States
- Area served: Worldwide
- Key people: Martin E. Franklin (Executive Chairman), Mark S. Tarchetti (President) and Michael B. Polk (CEO)
- Products: Outdoor Solutions, Branded Consumables and Consumer Solutions
- Revenue: ▲US$8.3 billion (FY 2014)
- Total assets: ▲US$10.8 billion (FY 2014)
- Total equity: ▲US$2.6 billion (FY 2014)
- Number of employees: 30,000+
- Parent: Newell Brands
- Website: jarden.com Archived at the Wayback Machine (archived 2013-04-02)

Jarden was an American consumer products company. Formed by the spin out of Ball Corporation's canning business, the company became a wider conglomerate of consumer brands, particularly in the outdoors and home appliances market. Jarden was acquired in 2016 by Newell Rubbermaid, which renamed itself Newell Brands.

== History ==
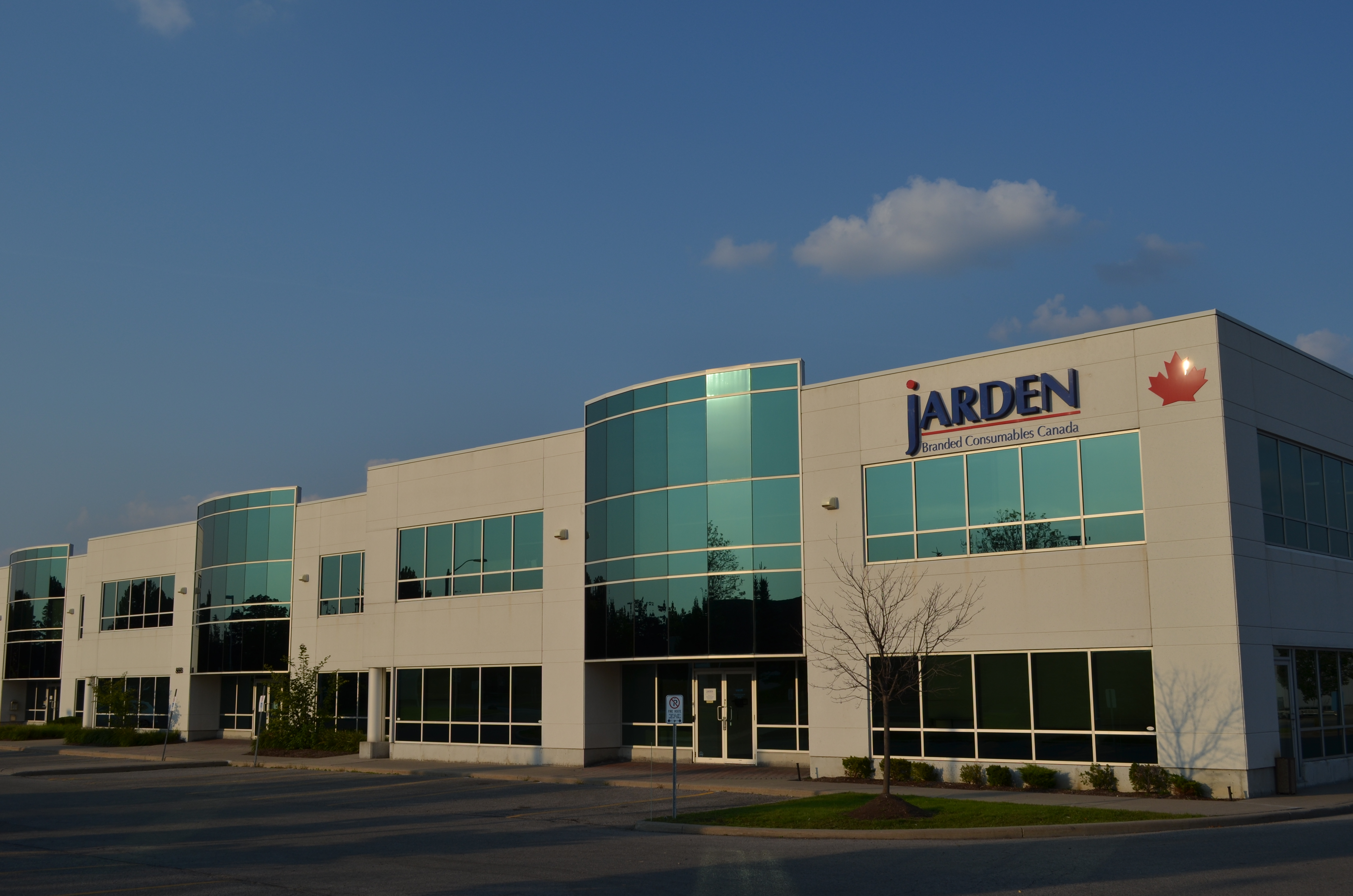
Jarden in Canada

In April 1993, Ball Corporation spun off its canning business as a new company called Alltrista Corporation. In May 2002, Alltrista changed its name to Jarden Corporation. The spin off retained the trademarks to the names Kerr, Ball, and Bernardin.

In April 2002, Jarden Corporation acquired Tilia International, owner of the Foodsaver brand, for approximately $160 million. In February 2003, Jarden acquired the Diamond Match Company for approximately $108 million. In September 2003, Jarden acquired Lehigh Consumer Products Corporation for approximately $155 million, giving it ownership of the brands Crawford, Lehigh, and Leslie Locke.

In March 2004, Jarden acquired Loew Cornell, a maker of brushes and other arts and crafts supplies for an estimated purchase price of $30 to $40 million, according to a research report issued by SunTrust Robinsion Humprey on April 27, 2004. In June 2004, Jarden bought a 75% stake in the United States Playing Card Company, and in October 2004, it purchased the remaining 25%.

The purchase price was approximately $240 million.

In January 2005, Jarden acquired American Household, Inc, for approximately $845 million. American Household, Inc. owned the Coleman Company, and Sunbeam Products, Inc. Brands acquired as part of this acquisition included Coleman, First Alert, Sunbeam, Mr. Coffee, and Oster.

In July 2005, Jarden acquired The Holmes Group, a manufacturer and distributor of select home environment and small kitchen electrics, for approximately $420 million in cash and approximately 6.2 million shares of Jarden common stock. The acquisition gave Jarden rights to the brands Rival, and Crock-Pot.

In August 2006, Jarden acquired Pine Mountain firelogs and firestarters from Conros Corporation for approximately $150 million.

In April 2007, Jarden acquired Pure Fishing, Inc. for approximately $400 million. In August 2007, Jarden acquired K2 Sports for approximately US$1.2 billion. K2 included brands such as Marker, Marmot, Rawlings, Sevylor, Shakespeare, and Völkl under its umbrella.

In April 2010, Jarden acquired the Mapa Spontex Baby Care and Home Care businesses for a total value, including debt assumed and/or repaid, of approximately $415 million. Later in 2010, Jarden acquired Quickie Manufacturing Corporation and Aero Products International, Inc. Brands acquired in these two transactions included Quickie, Aero, and Aerobed, among others.

In August 2012, Jarden acquired British company Pulse Home Products from Rutland Partners. Pulse Home Products made home products including Breville kettles, Dirt Devil vacuum cleaners and products for Nicky Clarke hair care. Pulse Home Products formerly belonged to British company Alba.

In September 2013, Jarden acquired Yankee Candle for $1.75 billion with cash, common equity and a mix of bank debt and bonds, a deal which Bank of America's Stefan M. Selig helped bring about. On October 14, 2015, Jarden announced that it would acquire Jostens, a producer of school memorabilia such as yearbooks, for $1.5 billion.

On December 14, 2015, Newell Rubbermaid announced that it would acquire Jarden for over $15 billion of cash and stock. The combined company is known as Newell Brands, with 55% owned by Newell's shareholders. The acquisition was completed on April 15, 2016.

On June 5, 2018, Newell announced it was selling the Rawlings division to a private equity group, SEP and MLB in order to focus on nine core product lines.

In 2018, Newell Brands sold Pure Fishing to New York based private equity firm, Sycamore Partners, in a transaction valued at approximately US$1.3 billion.

== Name ==
The company was renamed from Alltrista in May 2002. Martin E. Franklin joined the company in 2001, Franklin decided to change the name of the company to something that represented the company's heritage, and future. Martin Franklin conceived the Jarden name by combining the heritage of the Ball Mason Jar ("Jar") with the concept of products being used in the home (the "den"). "Jarden" also invokes the French word for garden (jardin), since the company planned to expand its product range outside the home.

== Brands ==
=== Branded Consumables ===
Branded Consumables are primarily niche, affordable, consumable household staples used in and around the home. Products tended to offer high gross margin with strong and stable cash flow generations. In July 2014, Branded Consumables delivered Net Sales of $3.0 billion with a Segment Earnings Margin of 17.4%.

- Acquisitions:
  - Breville brand in the United Kingdom. This is unrelated to Breville PTY (Australia), who owns all rights to the Breville brand outside European market, firms as Sage Appliances and markets selected products in Europe and the UK under the Sage brand by Heston Blumenthal.
  - Holmes Products, founded in 1982, by Jordan Kahn, in Milford, Massachusetts
  - John Oster Manufacturing Company, founded in 1924
  - Mr. Coffee, founded in 1972 in Cleveland, Ohio
  - Sunbeam Products, founded in 1897 in Chicago, Illinois
  - The Rival Company, founded in 1932
  - Oster Clipper, McMinnville, Tennessee

=== Outdoor Solutions ===
Outdoor Solutions are recreational products designed to help consumers enjoy the outdoors. Jarden was one of the largest hard goods sporting equipment company in the world, with leadership positions in United States, Europe and Japan. In July 2014, Outdoor Solutions delivered Net Sales of $2.7 billion with a Segment Earnings Margin of 11.0%.

- Acquisitions
  - ABU Garcia, founded in 1921 in Svängsta, Sweden.
  - Berkley, founded in 1937 in Spirit Lake, Iowa
  - Coleman Company, founded by William Coffin Coleman, in 1900 in Kingfisher, Oklahoma.
  - K2 Sports, founded in 1962 in Seattle, Washington.
  - Marker founded in 1952
  - Marmot, founded in 1974 in Grand Junction, Colorado.
  - Penn Reels, founded in 1932 in Philadelphia, Pennsylvania.
  - Rawlings, founded in 1887 in St. Louis, Missouri.
  - Shakespeare Fishing Tackle, founded in 1897 in Columbia, South Carolina.
  - Völkl, founded in 1923 in Straubing, Germany.
  - Worr Game Products, founded in 1987 in Corona, California.

=== Consumer Solutions ===
In July 2014, Consumer Solutions had net Sales of $2.2 billion with a Segment Earnings Margin of 16.2%.

- Acquisitions:
  - Diamond Match Company
  - First Alert, founded in 1958 in Aurora, Illinois.
  - United States Playing Card Company, founded in 1867 in Cincinnati, Ohio.
  - Yankee Candle, founded in 1969 in South Deerfield, Massachusetts.

=== Process Solutions ===
Jarden Corporation also owned Jarden Process Solutions that includes Jarden Plastic Solutions, Jarden Applied Materials, and Jarden Zinc Products. Jarden Zinc Products is best known as the principal supplier of zinc for the manufacture of the U.S. penny.

- Jarden Applied Materials
- Jarden Plastic Solutions
- Jarden Zinc Products

== Lawsuits ==
In January 2006, a class action lawsuit was filed against Jarden Corp and its CEO for securities fraud.

== See also ==
- List of outdoor industry parent companies
