= Jerry Levin =

Jerry Levin may refer to:

- Jerry Levin (journalist), CNN network journalist, kidnapped and held hostage by Hezbollah
- Jerry W. Levin, American businessman, CEO, turnaround expert and mergers & acquisitions specialist
- Gerald M. Levin, known as Jerry, American mass-media businessman
