= Sunbeam Australia =

- Company type: Subsidiary
- Industry: Manufacturing
- Founded: 1884; 142 years ago
- Headquarters: Sydney, Australia
- Products: Home Appliances
- Website: sunbeam.com.au

Sunbeam Corporation Limited was an Australian home appliance brand catering to the Australian and New Zealand markets. It is now a subsidiary of Sunbeam Products.

== Company history ==
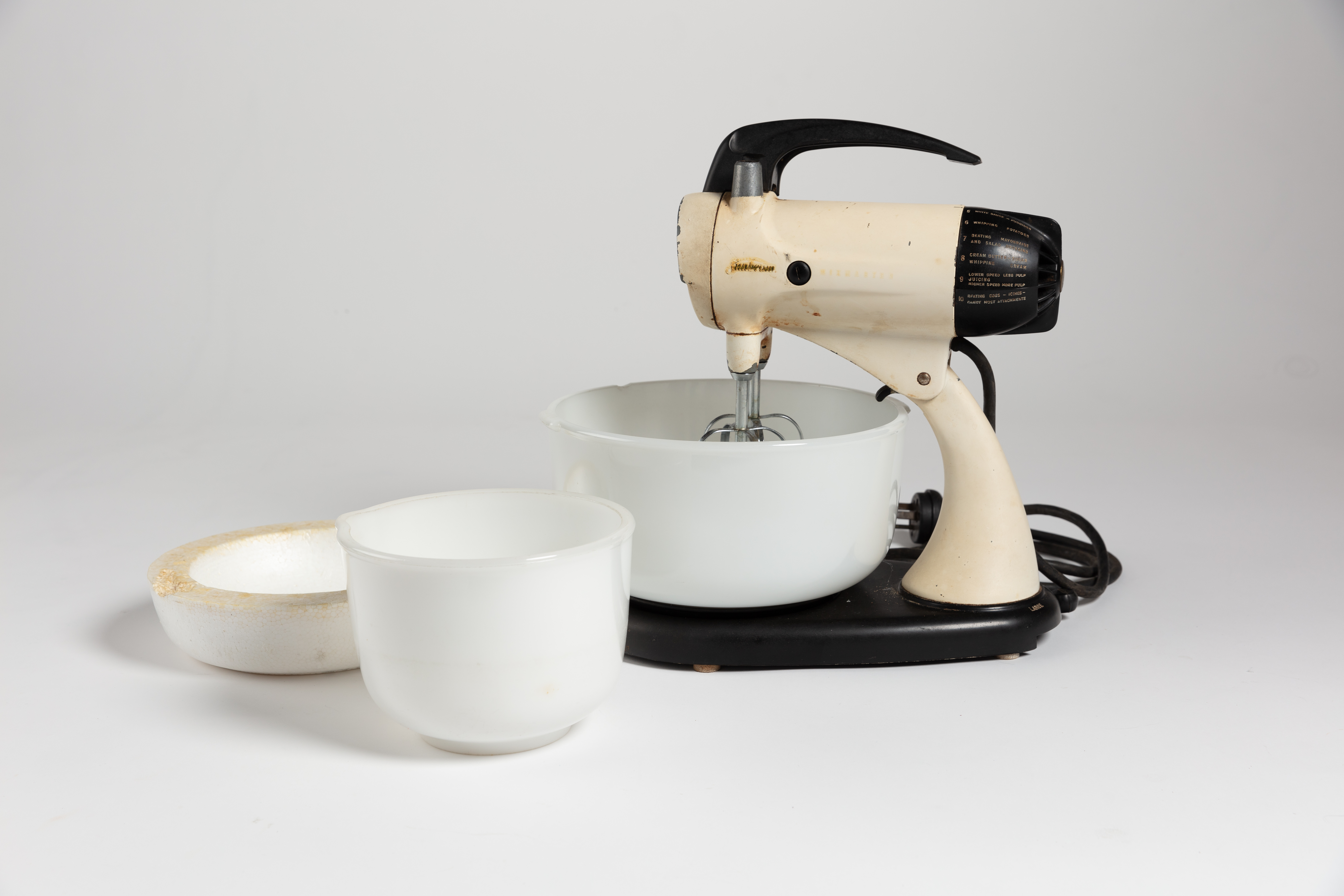
Sunbeam Mixmaster, sold in New Zealand in the 1950s

The company began in Australia in 1902 as a small branch of the American group, Chicago Flexible Shaft Company. The name was later changed to Cooper Engineering Company. The name changed again to Sunbeam Corporation in 1946. The company became publicly traded in 1952 and came into Australian ownership in 1987. In 1981 it obtained a range of consumer appliances from Monier Limited. Sunbeam Corporation was purchased by GUD Holdings Ltd in 1996 and sold to Sunbeam Products in 2016.

The American-designed Mixmaster 9B was the first Sunbeam appliance manufactured and sold in Australia in 1948. Starting in the late 1970s, Australian industrial designers were hired to create new designs. Sunbeam Australia also licensed its designs to other companies including Sunbeam Products Inc. including the Mixmaster Professional / Heritage Series Stand Mixer.

== See also ==
- Sunbeam Products Inc
