= Sharper Image =

American consumer electronics brand

- Industry: Consumer Electronics and Lifestyle Products
- Founded: 1977; 49 years ago San Francisco, California, U.S.
- Founder: Richard Thalheimer
- Defunct: 2008; 18 years ago (as retail stores)
- Fate: Chapter 11 Bankruptcy Liquidation
- Headquarters: Irvine, California, U.S.
- Parent: ThreeSixty Group
- Website: www.sharperimage.com

Sharper Image is an American consumer products retailer that sells home electronics and other lifestyle products through its website, catalog, and third-party retailers. The brand is owned by ThreeSixty Group, with the U.S. catalog and website owned and operated by Michigan-based Camelot Venture Group. Sharper Image filed for bankruptcy and closed all its retail stores in 2008. The brand has been in operation since its relaunch in 2010.

In 1977, lawyer and entrepreneur Richard Thalheimer founded the office supply retailer Thalheimer Business Systems in San Francisco, California. He later renamed his business The Sharper Image to help promote the quality of the copier paper and toner sold by his company. The Sharper Image expanded its product assortment to include high-end gadgets, electronics, massage chairs, and air purifiers. The Sharper Image eventually expanded to 187 retail stores in 38 states.

The Sharper Image sold merchandise through dozens of retail stores throughout the United States, a monthly catalog, and its website, along with business-to-business sales teams that marketed products for corporate incentive programs and wholesale to retailers.

In 2016, ThreeSixty Group, Inc. acquired The Sharper Image from Iconix Brand Group, Inc. Since 2015, ThreeSixty Group, Inc. has been owned by AEA Investors.

== Bankruptcy ==
Beginning in 2004, The Sharper Image saw a steady decline in sales. In court filings, the company cited "negative publicity" from litigation involving its Ionic Breeze air purifiers as one reason for the declining revenue. The Sharper Image sued the nonprofit product testing and rating organization Consumer Reports for giving the brand's Ionic Breeze air purifiers a "Fail" rating. Consumers sued The Sharper Image for ineffective air purification.

In 2006 there was a change in the board of directors of the company, and the removal of Thalheimer as CEO. Thalheimer was replaced by Chairman Jerry W. Levin. Not long after, on April 9, 2007, Steven A. Lightman became the president and CEO.

The Sharper Image stock price reached a record low of 29 cents a share on February 20, 2008. On February 25, 2008, The Sharper Image announced it had received notification that it would be delisted from the NASDAQ exchange. The company filed for bankruptcy protection with the U.S. Bankruptcy Court in Wilmington, Delaware after four years of sales losses and three straight years of losses. The Sharper Image said it had $251.5 million of assets and $199 million of debts as of January 31, 2008, according to the filing. Cash on hand totaled about $700,000. All of its retail stores were closed by the end of 2008.

On April 10, 2008, Levin resigned as a member and chairman of the board of the company to pursue participating with other investors to acquire some or all of the company's businesses or assets. News coverage pointed out the stocks fall from about $40 per share to about 23 cents (a $3.6 million market capitalization) at the time of his departure. Levin joined a group making a bid for the company; the group included hedge fund Ramius Capital, which was involved in Levin getting onto the company's board of directors, and Clinton Group, which announced a large stake in the company in December 2017.

=== Post-bankruptcy ===
On May 29, 2008, a joint venture led by units of private investment firms Hilco Consumer Capital, Infinity Lifestyle Brands, Gordon Brothers Group, and Bluestar Alliance won a bankruptcy auction to acquire the assets of The Sharper Image, paying $49 million (about $71.8 million in 2025) plus some contingent recovery for the company's assets. The Sharper Image name was then licensed and used to sell products through major third-party retailers and the branded website. New products were created through partnerships with other businesses.

In 2011, Iconix Brand Group bought The Sharper Image and took control of all licensing relationships, while Camelot Venture Group continued to operate the catalog and website. In June 2014, Camelot Venture Group acquired the rights to the U.S. direct-to-consumer division of the brand (catalog and e-commerce) from Iconix Brand Group.

=== Relaunch ===
In December 2016, Irvine-based ThreeSixty Group, the owner of brands such as FAO Schwarz and Vornado Air, purchased all remaining rights (including global manufacturing, distribution, and licensing rights) from Iconix Brand Group for $100 million (about $131 million in 2025). In 2019, ThreeSixty Group relaunched The Sharper Image with new logos, styling, slogans (including "Tomorrow's Tomorrow"), and a refreshed product assortment.

== Consumer Reports lawsuit ==
In 2002, Consumer Reports tested many fan-driven air purifiers alongside The Sharper Image's Ionic Breeze. Consumer Reports gave the Ionic Breeze a "Fail" rating, resulting in The Sharper Image suing the nonprofit organization and magazine. The lawsuit was dismissed, primarily owing to the court's finding that the company "has not shown that the test protocol used by Consumers Union was scientifically, or otherwise, invalid" and had not "demonstrated a reasonable probability that any of the challenged statements were false." Furthermore, The Sharper Image could not "come forward with any evidence from which a finding of malice could be made."

Two years later, Consumer Reports stated that The Sharper Image's Quadra air purifier could be dangerous to consumers' health because of the trace levels of ozone produced by the unit. As a result, the company's sales plummeted and its retail stores took back all Quadra units for a cash refund. The Sharper Image's response was to work with the Engelhard Corporation and create an ozone catalyst that reduced the amount of excess ozone in the purified air before it circulated throughout the room.
