= Marmot (company) =

Outdoor recreation clothing company

Marmot Mountain, LLC.
- Formerly: Marmot Mountain Works
- Type: Subsidiary
- Industry: Outdoor recreation, textile
- Founded: 1974; 52 years ago
- Headquarters: Rohnert Park, California
- Key people: Mark Martin
- Products: Clothing
- Parent: Newell Brands
- Website: marmot.com

Marmot is an American outdoor recreation clothing and sporting goods company. The company, headquartered in Rohnert Park, California, was founded by David Huntley, Eric Reynolds, and Tom Boyce.

The company was acquired by Newell Rubbermaid Brands in 2016.

== History ==
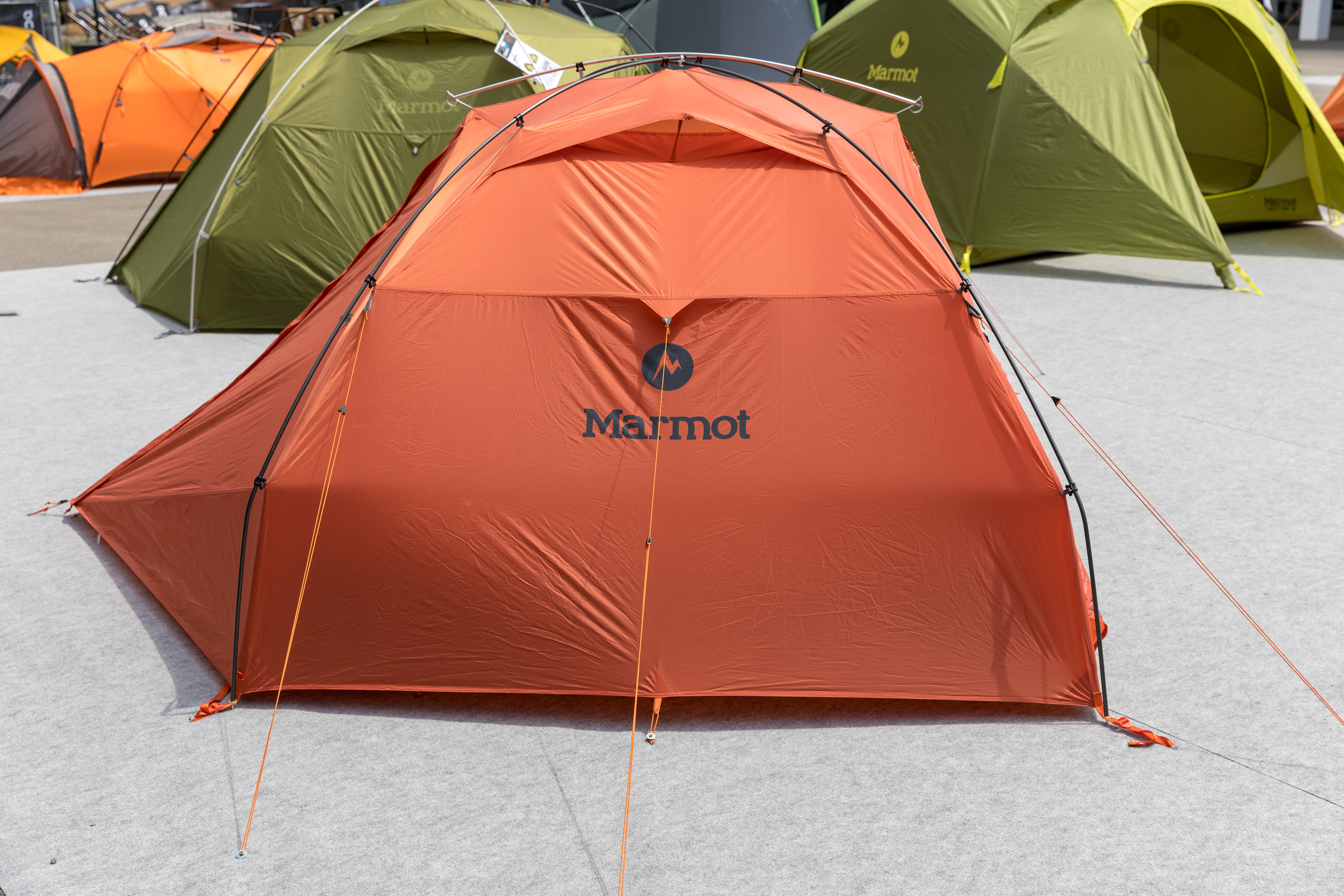
Marmot tent

Marmot was established in 1974 in Grand Junction, Colorado by University of California, Santa Cruz students David Huntley, Eric Reynolds, and Tom Boyce.

The company's Golden Mantle Parka was featured in the 1975 Clint Eastwood film, The Eiger Sanction.

In 1976, Marmot was one of the first customers to use and incorporate Gore-Tex into its early sleeping bag products.

Marmot was bought out of bankruptcy in 2004 when it was acquired by K2 sports for a reported $84 million. It became part of the Newell Rubbermaid brand in April 2016 after being acquired by Jarden in August 2007 for a reported $1.2 billion.
