= Dazey Products Company =

Defunct American home appliance manufacturer

- Type: Private
- Founded: 1965
- Fate: sold 1999
- Headquarters: Gardner, Kansas, United States
- Products: kitchen appliances, bedding, home and health products

The Dazey Products Company was an American home appliance manufacturer that was founded in 1965. The company specialized in the manufacture of kitchen gadgets. It manufactured brand names such as "Seal-A-Meal" and "Food Saver".

The Rival Company purchased Dazey's product line in November 1996.

The remnants of Dazey Products Company was dissolved by 1999.
