= Raymond Lombra =

American economist

Raymond Eugene "Ray" Lombra (born 1946 in Hamden, Connecticut) is an American economist and professor at Penn State University, where he is also the senior advisor to the Dean.

== Education ==
Lombra graduated from Providence College in 1967 with a BA in economics. He went on to graduate from Penn State in 1968 with a master's degree, and received his PhD there in 1971.

== Career ==
Lombra worked as a senior staff economist at the Board of Governors of the Federal Reserve System before joining the faculty at Penn State in 1977. He became Penn State's associate dean in 1992.

== Research ==
Lombra has published over 75 scholarly articles and six books. In 1990, Americans for Common Cents enlisted Lombra to produce evidence in support of continuing to make the U.S. penny. He subsequently testified before the Senate Banking Committee that eliminating the penny would “impose a significant and regressive rounding ‘tax’ on the American public”. He has also said that eliminating the penny would have especially adverse effects on people without checking accounts. He later elaborated on these claims in a 2001 paper he published in the Eastern Economic Journal which stated that the direct and indirect effects of eliminating the penny would be “no less than $1.5 billion over five years and $2.5 billion over a decade”.

== Personal life ==
Lombra and his wife, Bobbi, enjoy drinking fine wine and filling the resulting empty bottles with pennies.
