= Yankee Candle Co. v. New England Candle Co. =

The Yankee Candle Co. v. New England Candle Co., 14 F.Supp.2d 154 (1998) is a court case from the District of Massachusetts in the United States, holding that an individual shop within a shopping mall does not itself qualify as a "building" under 17 U.S.C. § 101. The case clarifies the scope of the Architectural Works Copyright Protection Act (AWCPA).

== Background ==
A year after the Yankee Candle Company opened a store in Holyoke, Massachusetts, the New England Candle Company opened a store in Enfield, Connecticut that looked "remarkably similar" and used many of the same design elements as the Yankee Candle store. On September 9, 1996, Yankee Candle filed suit against New England Candle, alleging copyright and trade dress infringement. Yankee Candle claimed copyright protection for both the blueprints and the actual design of the Holyoke store that was embodied in the blueprints.

== Opinion of the court ==
The court considered the scope of the term "building" under 17 U.S.C. § 101's definition of "architectural work". The court looked at dictionary definitions of "building" and the Code of Federal Regulations, and found that the Yankee Candle store was an internal structure, not a "building". Since Yankee Candle did not design the walls or ceilings of the store, Yankee Candle was not the author of the structure.

The court found that New England Candle infringed Yankee Candle's copyrighted blueprints, but granted New England's summary judgment on all other counts.
