= Copyright in architecture in the United States =

Copyright in architecture is an important, but little understood subject in the architectural discipline. Copyright is a legal concept that gives the creator of a work the exclusive right to use that work for a limited time. These rights can be an important mechanism through which architects can protect their designs.

== History of copyright in architecture ==
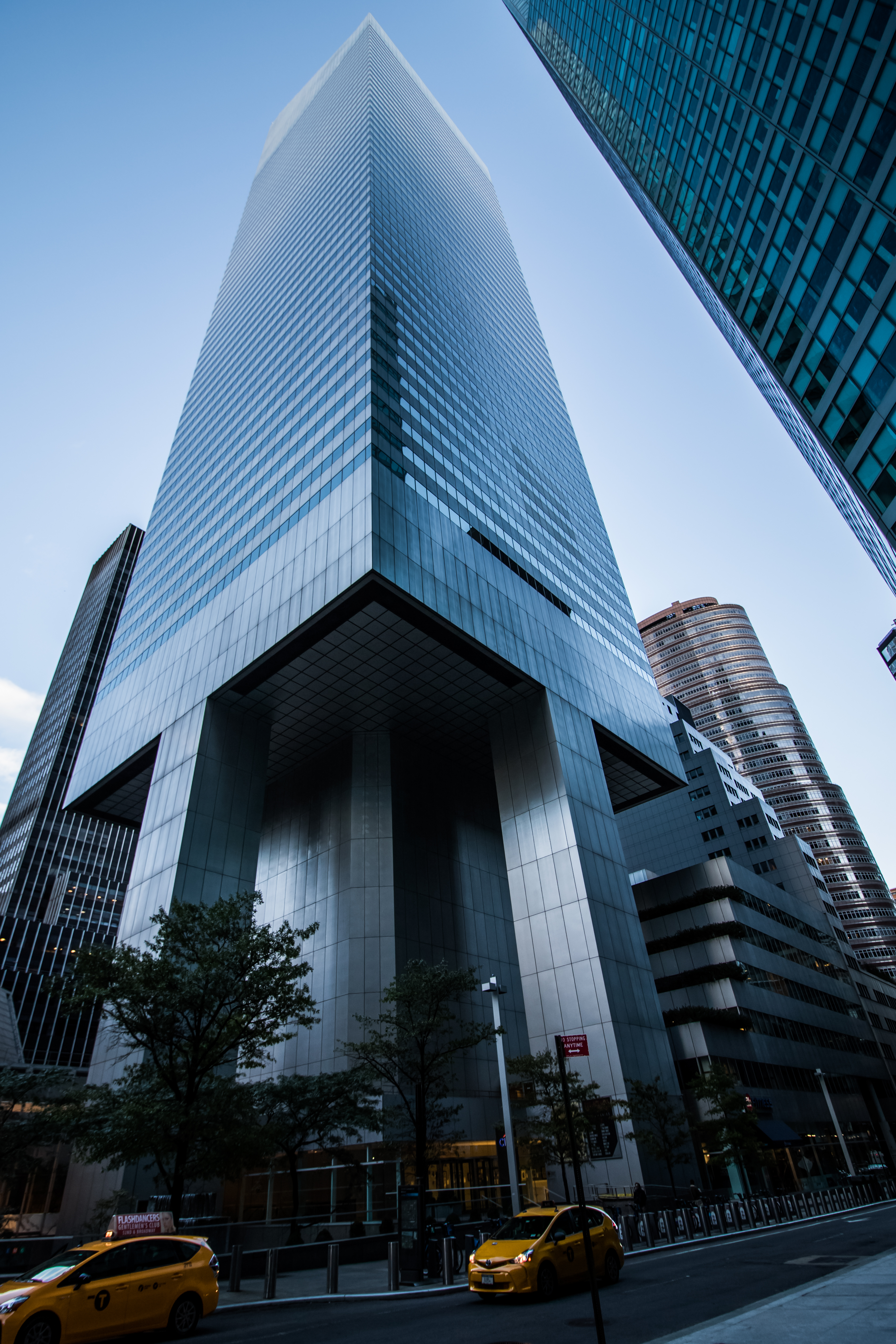
Pre-1990 architecture like the Citigroup Center (1977) were not protected by copyright

Architecture has not always been covered by copyright law. In 1790, when the first copyright law was passed, copyright was only granted in "books, maps, and charts". In 1909, Congress broadened the scope of copyright protection to include all "writings of an author". Although architectural drawings were not expressly included in the 1909 Act, copyright protection was included under the act for "[d]rawings or plastic works of a scientific or technical nature". Courts generally interpreted this provision to include an architectural blueprint. It was not until 1976 that Congress expressly stated its intent to include "an architect's plans and drawings", which were included under the protection of "pictorial, graphic, and sculptural works". However, such protection was qualified in that "the extent to which protection would extend to the structure depicted would depend on circumstances". As a result, under the 1976 Act, most courts held that even this grant of coverage to an architect's plans and drawings did not protect an architect's right to build structures depicted in the drawings. Courts generally held that both the utilitarian doctrine prohibiting copyright in useful articles and the idea-expression dichotomy prohibiting copyright in ideas barred protection of buildings designed from architectural plans.

In 1989, the United States joined the Berne Convention for the Protection of Literary and Artistic Works, which required that its signatories protect completed architectural works from infringement. As a result of both this convention and a recognition by Congress that "architecture is an art form that performs a very public, societal purpose . . . deserving of protection under the Copyright Act", Congress passed the Architectural Works Copyright Protection Act (AWCPA) in 1990, which amended the Copyright Act to specifically include "architectural works" among the list of protected works in 17 U.S.C. § 102.

== Rights granted to architects by copyright law ==
Copyright in architectural works is established under 17 U.S.C. § 102(a)(8). Moreover, protection of pictorial, graphic, and sculptural works is established under 17 U.S.C. § 102(a)(5). Thus, architects can receive two levels of protection for their works: one for the design of a building as embodied in buildings, architectural plans, or drawings under § 102(a)(8) and one for diagrams, models, and technical drawings themselves under § 102(a)(5).

Copyright in a design, whether registered under § 102(a)(5) or § 102(a)(8), generally gives an architect the exclusive right to reproduce, distribute, display, and prepare a work based upon the design. This protection, unless the work is a work-made-for-hire, lasts for the life of the author plus 70 years. However, several limitations on those rights apply depending upon which section the work is registered under. The most significant limitation to registering a design as a "pictorial, graphic, or sculptural" work under § 102(a)(5) is that the copyright owner cannot prevent the construction of a building based upon the registered design. In contrast, while construction of a building can be prevented under § 102(a)(8), two other important limitations apply when registering a design as an "architectural work". First, when a building is ordinarily visible from a public place, its protection as an "architectural work" does not include the right to prevent the making, distributing, or public display of pictures, photographs, or other pictorial representations of the work. Thus, the architect will not be able to prevent people from taking photographs or otherwise producing pictorial representations of the building. Second, owners of a copyrighted building may both make or authorize the making of alterations to the building and destroy or authorize destruction of the building. Thus, the architect will not have the right to prevent the owner of a house that they designed from altering or destroying the building. This exception also allows owners of partially complete buildings to complete the building using construction plans created by the architect.

An architect is not strictly limited to the set of rights granted in the Copyright Act, as the architect may contract for greater rights.

== Types of architectural works protected by copyright law ==
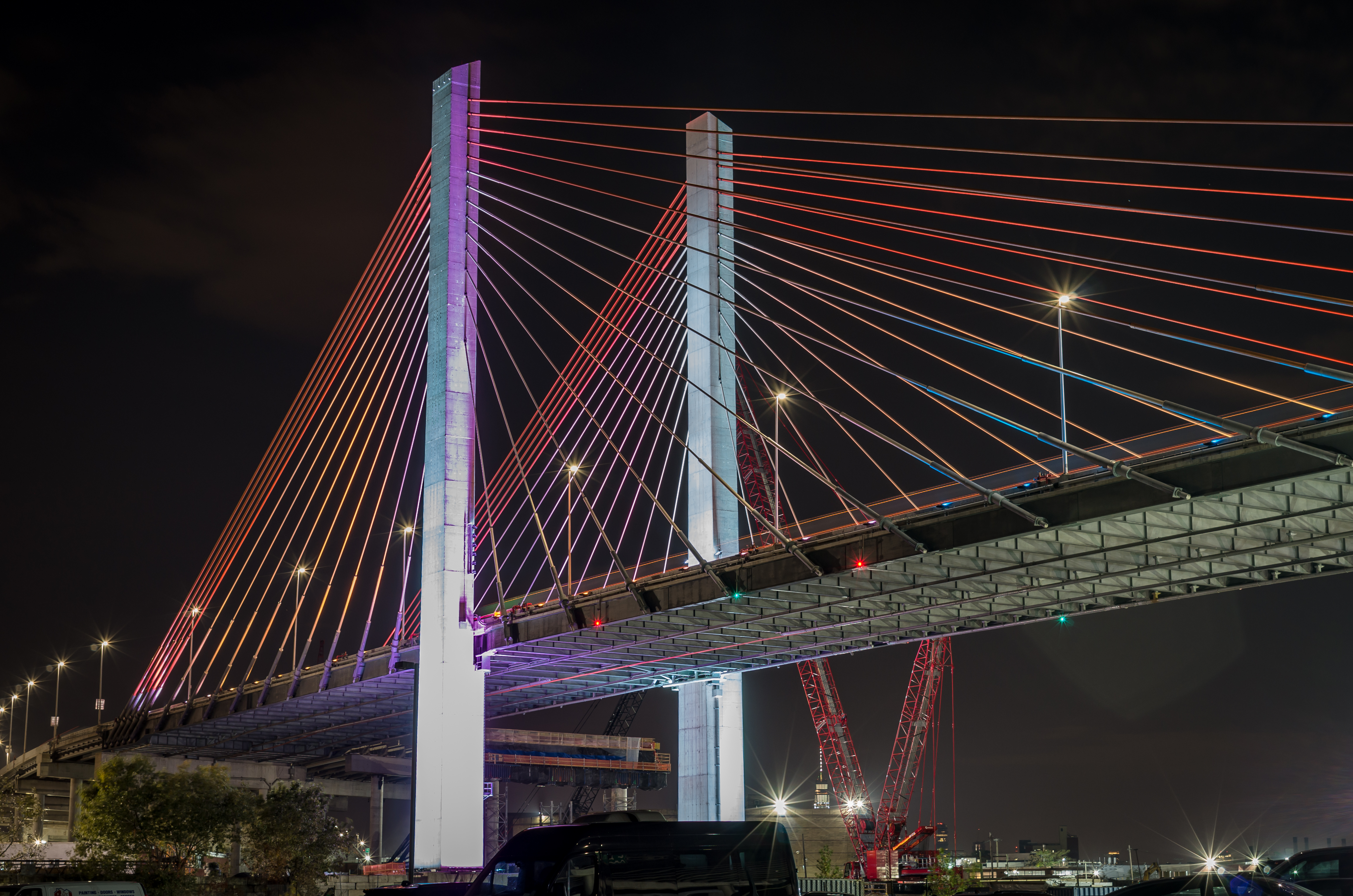
The Kosciuszko Bridge in New York City, completed in 2019, is not a copyrightable architectural work under United States law.

Copyright protection can be extended to general drawings and blueprints, preliminary plans, sections, elevations, floor plans, construction plans, rough models, models of internal support, models of external appearance, photomontages of the building against backdrops, computer-generated images of a design, and constructed buildings. The designs embodied in any of these types of works need not be capable of construction to be protected.

In order to obtain protection as an "architectural work" under 17 U.S.C. § 102(a)(8), as opposed to a "pictorial, graphic, or sculptural work" under 17 U.S.C. § 102(a)(5), the work must include a design of a building. "Buildings" are defined in the Copyright Office as "humanly habitable structures that are intended to be both permanent and stationary, such as houses and office buildings, and other permanent and stationary structures designed for human occupancy, including but not limited to churches, museums, gazebos, and garden pavilions". Specifically prohibited from protection are "structures other than buildings, such as bridges, cloverleafs, dams, walkways, tents, recreational vehicles, mobile homes, and boats".

== Requirements for copyright protection in an architectural design ==
=== Time of creation ===
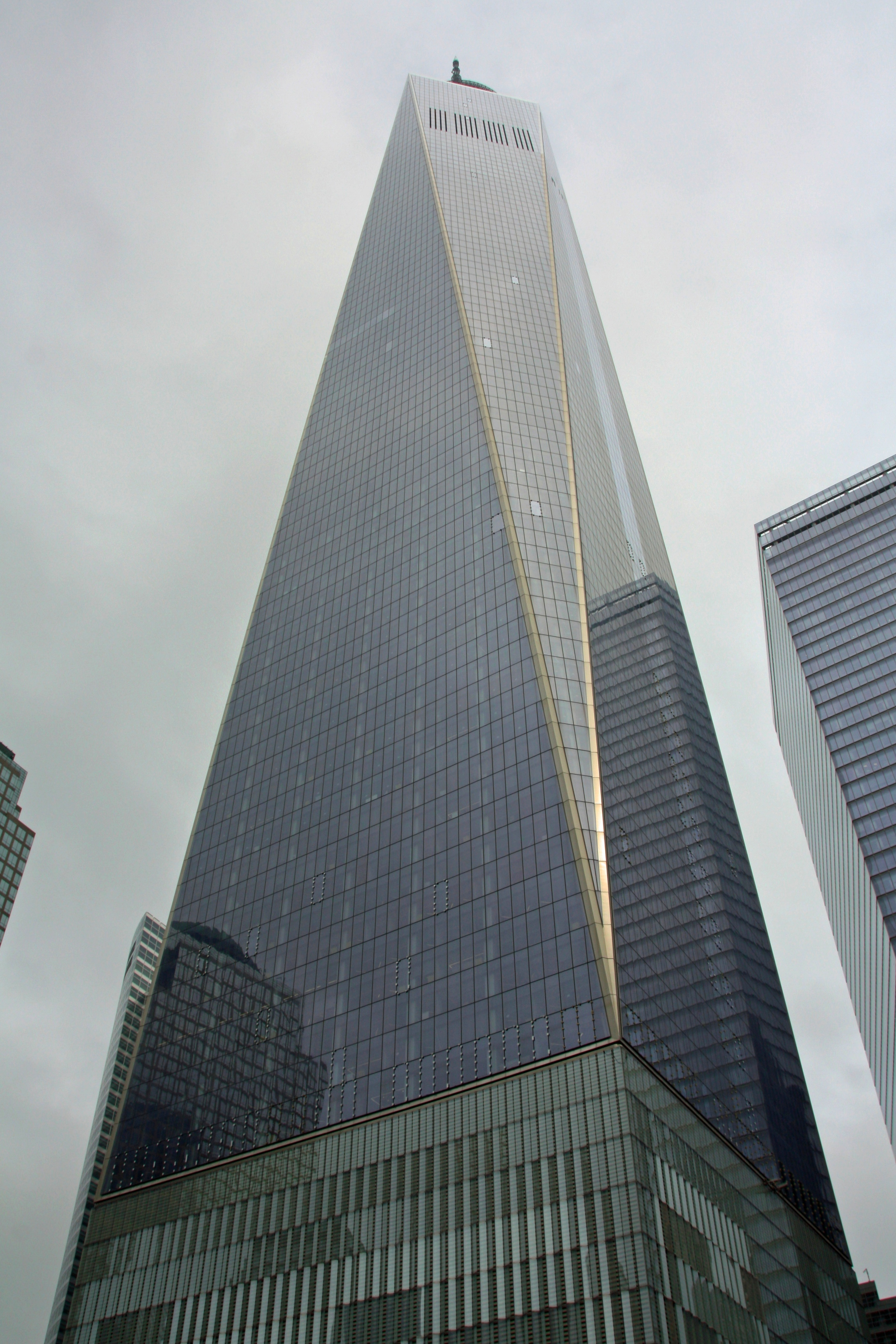
One World Trade Center in New York City, topped out on May 10, 2013, and is thus a copyrighted architectural work

Protection for "architectural works" under § 102(a)(8) is available generally only for those works created on or after December 1, 1990. This means that a building cannot have been substantially completed before December 1, 1990, nor can a work have been published before that date. However, if the work was unconstructed and embodied in unpublished plans or drawings before that date, it might still be protectable. Protection for architectural drawings as "pictorial, graphic, or sculptural" works under § 102(a)(5) is valid if created after 1976.

An architectural work is eligible for copyright protection only if:

The architectural work was created on or after December 1, 1990, or

The architectural work was created before December 1, 1990, and

The architectural work was, on December 1, 1990, unconstructed and embodied in unpublished plans and/or drawings, and

The architectural work was constructed between December 1, 1990, and December 31, 2002, inclusive.

=== Registration and notice ===
A design has copyright protection automatically beginning at the time of creation. Thus, an architect need not register a work nor place notice on the work to obtain copyright protection.

Despite the fact that a design does not have to be registered to be protectable, registration is beneficial for several reasons: (1) registration is necessary before an infringement suit can be brought in court; (2) registration within three months of publication or prior to infringement of the work will allow statutory damages and attorney's fees to be collected upon a finding of infringement, whereas otherwise, only an award of actual damages and profits is available; and (3) if registration is made within five years of publication, it will constitute prima facie evidence of the validity of the copyright and of the facts stated in the certificate.

Likewise, while notice is not required to be placed on an architectural design, doing so can be advantageous for a couple of reasons: (1) it can help avoid infringement of a work by putting people on notice of its copyright status; and (2) it prevents an infringer from getting a reduced damage award by arguing innocent infringement. A proper notice consists of: (1) the symbol ©, or the word "Copyright", or the abbreviation "Copr."; and (2) the year of first publication of the work; and (3) the name of the owner of copyright in the work.

=== Originality ===
Protection of an "architectural work" extends to "the overall form as well as the arrangement and composition of spaces and elements in the design, but does not include individual standard features". According to the Congressional Report from the 1990 bill, this span of coverage "recognizes that: (1) creativity in architecture frequently takes the form of a selection, coordination, or arrangement of unprotectible elements into an original, protectable whole; (2) an architect may incorporate new, protectable design elements into otherwise standard, unprotectible building features [and still maintain protection]; and (3) interior architecture may be protected."

Despite this seemingly broad grant of coverage, copyright protection only extends to "original works of authorship". Therefore, in order for an architectural design to be protected, it must be an original design. This "originality" requirement "means only that the work was independently created by the author (as opposed to copied from other works), and that it possesses at least some minimal degree of creativity". As a result, "[c]ourts have routinely protected modern architectural structures, such as commercial homes, that possess the minimal amount of originality that copyright requires, as well as the plans from which owners built them." For instance, in Shine v. Childs, where an architecture student brought suit against the Freedom Tower architect, the court found that the student's design, called "Olympic Tower", was original, noting that "[i]t is true that . . . twisting towers have been built before. Towers with diamond-windowed facades have been built before. Towers with support grids similar to the one in Olympic Tower have been built before. Towers with setbacks have been built before. But defendants do not present any evidence that the particular combinations of design elements . . . are unoriginal." Thus, the court held that the "dash of originality" required for copyrightability had been met. Likewise, in Oravec v. Sunny Isles Luxury Ventures, the court held the design of a building to be original, noting that "copyright will not protect the mere idea of a convex/concave building, any more than it would protect the idea of an arch or dome or tower. . . . But this does not mean that the particularized expression of a dome, arch or tower (or convex/concave building for that matter) cannot be protected within the context of a particular design."

=== Nonfunctionality ===
"Consistent with other provisions of the Copyright Act and copyright regulations, . . . protection [of architectural works] does not extend to standard features, such as common windows, doors, and other staple building components." As architect Michael Graves explained, copyright protection covers only the "poetic language" of an architectural work, which includes those parts of the design that are "responsive to issues external to the building, and incorporates the three-dimensional expression of the myths and rituals of society". It does not cover "internal language", which includes those parts of the design that are "intrinsic to the building in its most basic form – determined by its pragmatic, constructional, and technical requirements." Thus, for example, individual elements that are driven by function are not copyrightable, including the presence of doors and windows or those elements required by building codes. Accordingly, architectural designs must be analyzed to determine the scope of their functionality.

Architectural designs registered as pictorial, graphic, or sculptural works under § 102(a)(5) are evaluated for functionality under the separability test. Under 17 U.S.C. § 101, pictorial, graphic, and sculpture works are protected "insofar as their form but not their mechanical or utilitarian aspects are concerned; the design of a useful article . . . shall be considered a pictorial, graphic, or sculptural work only if, and to the extent that, such design incorporates . . . features that can be identified separately from, and are capable of existing independently of, the utilitarian aspects of the article." Thus, for example, a building constructed from the plan registered under 17 U.S.C. § 102(a)(5) is not protectable because the functional elements of a building cannot exist separately and independently from the aesthetic elements of the building. On the other hand, architectural blueprints and plans have been held to be protectable because the plans themselves are not the useful articles, but are rather the expression of the useful articles.

Architectural designs registered as architectural works under § 102(a)(8), however, are not evaluated under the separability test. Rather, Congress suggested that a two-step analysis should be undertaken to determine the copyrightability of an architectural work. First, the architectural work must be examined to determine whether original design elements are present. Second, if the design elements are present, the original elements must be examined to determine whether they are functionally required. If the elements are required, the work is not protectable. On the other hand, if the original elements are not required, the work will be protectable without regard to physical or conceptual separability of the elements. As a result, "the aesthetically pleasing overall shape of an architectural work (can) be protected".

== Ownership of copyright in architectural designs ==
Under 17 U.S.C. § 201(a), "copyright in a work . . . vests initially in the author or authors of the work." Although the Copyright Act does not define "author", a person who creates a work is generally considered an author. Thus, an architect will almost always own their own designs. A few exceptions, however, are discussed below.

=== Joint authorship ===
Under 17 U.S.C. § 201(a), joint authors of a work are co-owners of the copyright in the work and cannot be liable to one another for copyright infringement. Joint authorship allows the authors to both independently exploit the copyright and to independently license the use of the copyright.

A work is considered a joint work if it is a "work prepared by two or more authors with the intention that their contributions be merged into an inseparable or interdependent parts of a unitary whole." Thus, to be considered a joint work, each author must contribute original expression and the authors must have intended that the work be considered a joint work. For example, in Gordon v. Lee, an architect and the president of a construction venture were not considered joint authors both because the president, who had no background in architecture, contributed no original expression and because there was no intent on the part of the architect to make the president a joint author. On the other hand, two architects in the same design firm who worked together to produce the designs were considered by the court to be joint authors both because "[n]either person was exclusively responsible for any of the designs, and the details were used from one design to another" and because the architects stated that the design was a "collaborative effort".

=== Work-made-for-hire ===
Although copyright ownership generally vests in an architect who designs a work, the Copyright Act specifies an exception called the "work-made-for-hire" doctrine. Under this doctrine, an employee who prepares a design within the scope of their employment will not be the author of the work. Rather, the employer is considered the author and copyright owner of the design. Despite this exception, an architect's work is rarely considered a work-made-for-hire because to be considered an "employee", several factors are considered, the most important being whether the person received employee benefits and was treated under tax law as an employee. Architects rarely receive such benefits from the person who hired them and therefore generally own the copyright in the works themselves. However the architect's employee, even if they alone executed the work, typically do not own the copyright. For example, in Bonner v. Dawson, an architect's work was not considered a work-made-for-hire, although hired by the client, because he was "clearly in the capacity of an independent contractor rather than an employee".

=== Transfer of ownership ===
Under 17 U.S.C. § 204(a), a "transfer of copyright ownership" can occur if it is "in writing and signed by the owner of the rights conveyed or such owner's duly authorized agent". Thus, ownership in an architectural work can be transferred by contract. For instance, in Dellacasa v. John Moriarty & Associates, a subcontractor's shop drawings were held to have been transferred to the general contractor where the contract stated that the general contractor would "retain all common law, statutory, and other reserved rights, in addition to the copyright (including, without limitation, the right to create derivative works therefrom)." Likewise, in Oravec v. Sunny Isles Luxury Ventures, the copyright in a design was held to have been transferred when the design was entered into a design competition, and the architect signed a letter "signifying [his] agreement that [he] reserve[d] no patent, trademark, copyright, trade secret or other intellectual property rights in any of the material that forms or is contained in [his] proposal."

Despite the requirement that transfers of ownership must be in writing, courts have held that a nonexclusive license may be granted without a written instrument. A nonexclusive license does not transfer ownership rights in the work, but does provide the grantee the right to use the copyright in a work in a particular manner. These licenses can be obtained from any owner of a copyrighted work, including a co-owner, and can be obtained from consent or even lack of objection.

== Infringement of architectural designs ==
If an architect is found liable for infringing another work, they could have an injunction issued against them to prevent them from creating the work or be subject to an impoundment wherein the work is destroyed. Moreover, an infringing architect could be liable for actual damages suffered by the plaintiff, profits that the architect made from the infringement, the plaintiff's costs and attorney's fees, and even criminal penalties if the infringement was willful. Similarly, if an architect successfully brings a suit against another architect, they could obtain an injunction or impoundment or recover damages. Thus, recognizing copyright infringement is an important skill for an architect to have to either avoid infringement or determine that another is infringing a work.

According to the Congressional record, "determinations of infringement of architectural works are to be made according to the same standard applicable to all other forms of protected subject matter." Moreover, the references to "overall form" and the nonprotectability of "individual standard features" in the statutory definition "are not intended to indicate that a higher standard of similarity is required to prove infringement of an architectural work, or that the scope of protection of architectural works is limited to verbatim or near-verbatim copying." Thus, infringement of architectural designs, whether registered as a pictorial, graphic, or structural work or an architectural work, is determined by the same standard as all other copyrighted works.

The test for copyright infringement can vary by jurisdiction, but usually involves two steps. First, a court will determine whether there has been copying in fact, which generally includes an analysis of the defendant's access to the copyrighted work and whether the similarity between the two works suggest copying. Second, the court will determine whether the works are substantially similar, which involves comparing only the copyrightable elements of the original and allegedly infringing works.

=== Copying-in-fact ===
The first step of the infringement analysis, copying-in-fact, includes determining that the defendant actually copied the work as a factual matter. Because direct evidence of copying is rare, courts tend to permit evidence showing that (1) the defendant had access to the copyrighted work and so had the opportunity to copy the work and (2) a sufficient degree of similarity exists between the two works to rise to an inference of actual copying. For instance, in T-Peg, Inc. v. Vermont Timber Work, Inc., the court found that a home builder had access to a contractor's plans because the contractor had supplied the builder with plans such that "both the plaintiff and the defendant had possession of plaintiff's work". The court likewise found that there was a sufficient degree of similarity. On the other hand, in Shine v. Childs, the architect who designed One World Trade Center was found not to have copied an architecture student's preliminary design because although the architect had access to the work, the idea of a twisting tower with rectangular bases and parallels sides was "by no means unique" such that there was no evidence that the architect could only have thought of the design by viewing the architecture student's work.

=== Substantial similarity ===
Even where copying has been conceded, however, "no legal consequences will follow from that fact unless the copying is substantial". Determining whether a work is substantially similar is a complicated endeavor. To do so, courts have used the "ordinary observer" or "overall look and feel" test, under which two works will be substantially similar if a "reasonable, ordinary observer, upon examination of the two works, would 'conclude that the defendant unlawfully appropriated the plaintiff's protectable expression'."

Both similarities and differences can be considered in determining "substantial similarity". However, "if 'the ordinary observer, unless he set out to detect the disparities, would be disposed to overlook them'", then the two works will still be considered substantially similar. For example, in Shine v. Childs, the court noted that One World Trade Center's design, while not similar to an architecture student's preliminary design, could be found to be substantially similar to the student's more detailed "Olympic Tower" design despite differences in the number of sides of each tower that twist, the direction of the twist, and the shape of each tower's ground floor because those differences could be overlooked due to similarities such as the form of the towers and the pattern covering the façade of the towers. Likewise, the court in Bonner v. Dawson held two buildings to be substantially similar, noting that "[a]lthough there are certain differences between the two buildings such as the building's size, interior layout, exterior stripe color, and some window variations, the overall architectural concept and designs of each of the two buildings is overwhelmingly similar."

Determining whether infringement has occurred is not a simple undertaking. However, the more similar various aspects of a work are, the more likely a work will be considered to have the same "overall look and feel" and therefore be infringing. Characteristics that courts have included in their analysis include frame footprint and dimensions, layout of floor plan, number of rooms, wall height, roof pitch and dimensions, overall square footage, number and placement of windows, façade style, and silhouette of the building.

== Film rights ==
Traditionally, architectural work has not been considered a derivative work in American location shooting, but as the effects of architectural copyright settle in, more architectural copyright holders are starting to demand it, and this practice may open up a wide field of litigation, especially in California. Although architectural copyright does not apply to pictures if the architectural work is regularly visible from a public place, it does not make such an exemption for the interior of a non-public building. Producers of news photography (still or motion) are theoretically protected by the First Amendment or through the fair use doctrine.

This contrasts with the practices of other countries such as France where producers regularly pay an architectural copyright fee.

== Reproduction of architectural plans ==
Courts tend to rule inconsistently with regards to the use of Section 120(a), or the pictorial representations limitation of the law, as the defense for users, mainly real estate firms, reproducing architectural plans. Margalit Zimand (2024) claims the exception generated a significant loophole allowing the plans to be exploited commercially, since the said works are also defined as "architectural works" in the definition section of the copyright law.

In the case Designworks Homes, Inc. v. Columbia House of Brokers Realty, Inc., the United States District Court for the Western District of Missouri ruled, in 2019, in favor of the realtor, who had published floor plans for the purpose of selling the homes. The court stated that the act fell under the scope of the pictorial representations limitation, since the building can be seen from a public place and the floor plan "is a pictorial representation of the structure's interior as it exists." The plaintiffs appealed to the United States Court of Appeals for the Eighth Circuit in 2021, which overturned the district court's ruling and stated that the pictorial representations limitation cannot be used in the "copying and publishing of floor plans depicting, in part, underlying copyrightable works." The appellate court considered floor plans as purely functional objects, as opposed to artistic objects like paintings that are protected by the pictorial representations limitation. On June 27, 2022, the Supreme Court declined the realtor's petition to review and contest the appellate court's ruling.

== See also ==
- Architecture of the United States
- Copyright law of the United States
- Freedom of panorama
- The Yankee Candle Co. v. New England Candle Co.
