= Holmes Products =

- Industry: Consumer products
- Founded: 1982
- Founder: Jordan Kahn
- Products: Home appliances
- Parent: Newell Brands
- Website: www.holmesproducts.com

Holmes Products Corp. or Holmes Group is a company based in Milford, Massachusetts, that produces mechanical fans, space heaters, and humidifiers.

== History ==
Holmes Products was founded by Jordan Kahn in 1982. In 2005, Berkshire Partners, Holmes' parent company, sold Holmes Products to Jarden Corporation for US$625.9 million. At the time of the sale, the brands of Holmes included Rival (acquired in 1999), Crock-Pot, Bionaire and White Mountain. In 2015, Jarden Corporation was combined into Newell Brands and operates under Sunbeam Products, Inc. It licenses its fans to SEG Products, a Montreal based consumer goods company.
