= Osterizer =

Brand which has been used by Oster Manufacturing for its line of blenders

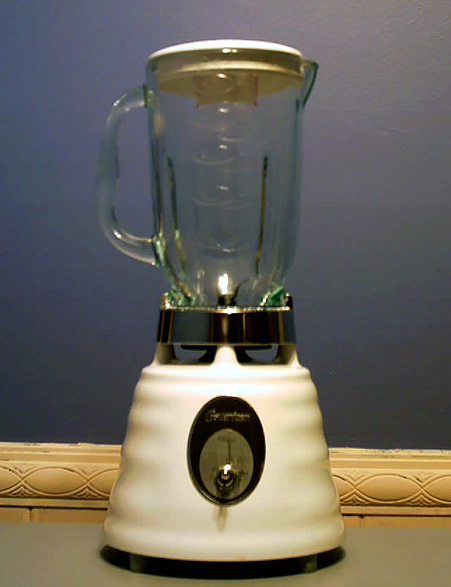
Osterizer single speed "beehive" blender

Osterizer is a brand which has been used by Oster Manufacturing for its line of blenders since 1946.

== History ==
It has been claimed to be the first mainstream brand of blender, though technically the Waring blender brand was introduced in 1937.

In 1946, Oster acquired the Stevens Electric Company, which had received a patent on the liquifying blender in 1922. Oster itself was bought by Sunbeam Corporation in 1960.

== Sources ==
- J. Hebey, Domestic Aesthetic: Household Art 1920–1970, 5 Continents Publishing, 2003. ISBN 88-7439-017-3.
- M. Young, World Almanac Book of Records, World Almanac, 2006. ISBN 0-88687-946-9.
- B. Huxford, Garage Sale & Flea Market Annual, Collector Books, 2004. ISBN 1-57432-386-5.
