= Yankee Candle =

American manufacturer and retailer

The Yankee Candle Company, Inc.
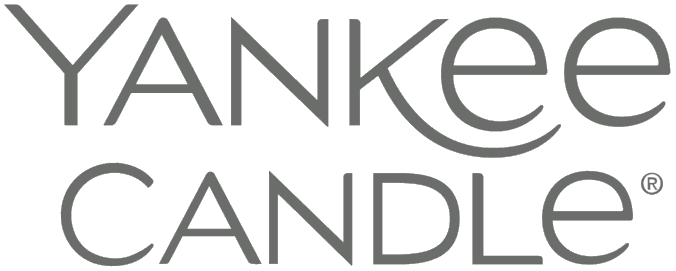
- Type: Subsidiary
- Industry: Consumer products
- Founded: 1969; 57 years ago
- Founder: Michael Kittredge
- Headquarters: South Deerfield, Massachusetts, U.S.
- Number of locations: 217 as of July 2025
- Revenue: US$ 844.2 million (2013)
- Parent: Newell Brands (2015–present)
- Subsidiaries: Chesapeake Bay Candle; WoodWick
- Website: yankeecandle.com

The Yankee Candle Company, Inc., doing business as Yankee Candle, is an American manufacturer and retailer of scented candles, candleholders, accessories, and dinnerware. Its products are sold by thousands of gift shops nationwide, through catalogs, and online, and in nearly 50 countries around the world. The company currently operates 217 small-box format stores, located in malls across 37 U.S. states and Ontario, and is the largest candle manufacturer in the United States. The company is headquartered in South Deerfield, Massachusetts.

The Jarden Corporation agreed to buy Yankee Candle for $1.75 billion in the fall of 2013. In 2015, Newell Rubbermaid announced that it would acquire Jarden for over $15 billion of cash and stock.

== History ==
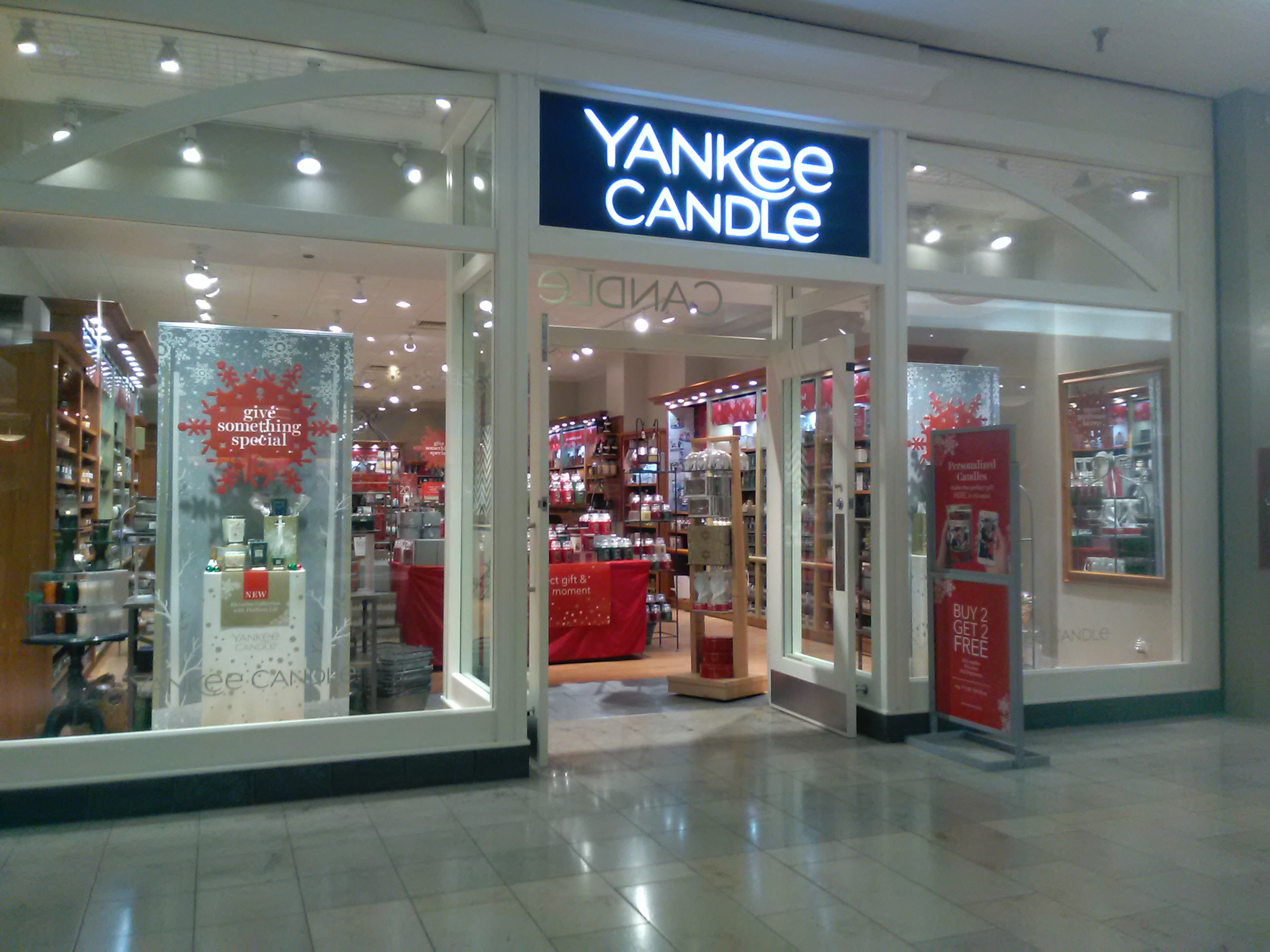
The Yankee Candle store in The Crossroads mall in Portage, Michigan

Yankee Candle Company was started in 1969 in South Hadley, Massachusetts, by Michael Kittredge II. To support the company's expansion, it was sold to New York-based private equity firm Forstmann Little in 1998 for $500 million.

After a cancer scare in 1993, Kittredge started handing the company over to a friend and employee. To finance its primary objective of significantly expanding its retail store network, the company required a substantial infusion of capital. With this need in mind, the company was sold in 1998 to New York-based private equity company Forstmann Little for $500 million. Forstmann took the company public in 1999, and in 2001, hired Craig Rydin as a CEO. Rydin launched a major advertising campaign and the line was picked up by mass retailers Linens-N-Things and Bed Bath & Beyond, pushing sales to their highest levels yet. Kittredge remained the company's chairman emeritus.

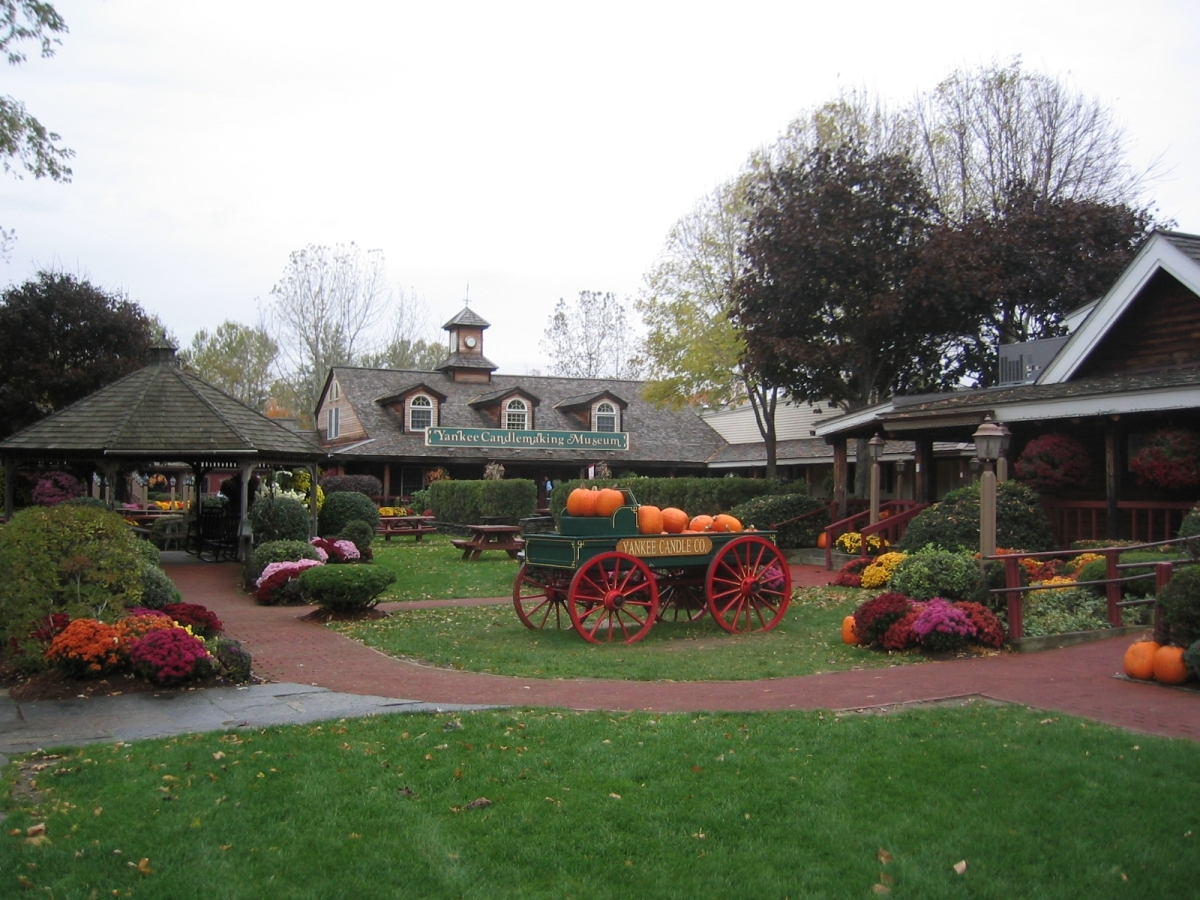
Grounds outside the candle making museum

During the summer of 2006, Yankee Candle purchased Illuminations, a Petaluma, California-based, multi-channel retailer of high quality candles and home accessories. Although the two companies were similar, the names were separated, with Illuminations being aimed at a different demographic. The Illuminations brand and web store were phased out in early 2009.

On February 6, 2007, the company was acquired by the private equity group of Madison Dearborn Partners LLC for approximately $1.6 billion.

In October 2012 Yankee Candle Europe launched their Consumer Direct website offering their products direct to consumers.

In 2013, Jarden acquired Yankee Candle. A further merger in 2016 saw Jarden purchased by Newell Rubbermaid and combined into the new company Newell Brands.

In 2017 Newell Brands acquired Smith Mountain Industries, makers of the Woodwick brand of candles. Woodwick candles are now a premium brand sold by Yankee Candle. The candles have a wooden wick that crackles when burned and use a blend of paraffin and soy wax to reduce spatter and residue.

Along with Smith Mountain Industries, Newell Brands also acquired Chesapeake Bay Candle in 2017 for $75 million. The company was founded in early 1994 by Mei Xu and David Wang. Chesapeake Bay candles are now part of Yankee Candle's product offering.

On 16 January 2025, it was reported that Yankee Candle may be shutting down its operations in Malaysia. A spokesperson from the company has revealed that the closing of outlets in the country is due to reducing demands and sales as well as logistical challenges post-pandemic.

=== COVID-19 ===
Since the outbreak of the COVID-19 pandemic, social media users observed a correlation between increases in reported COVID-19 cases and negative reviews of Yankee Candle products. Individuals scraping review data of both scented and unscented candles on Amazon.com found an increase in negative reviews for scented candles, with the proportion of reviews complaining of a lack of aroma also growing. In comparison, unscented candles did not exhibit this pattern.

== Flagship store ==
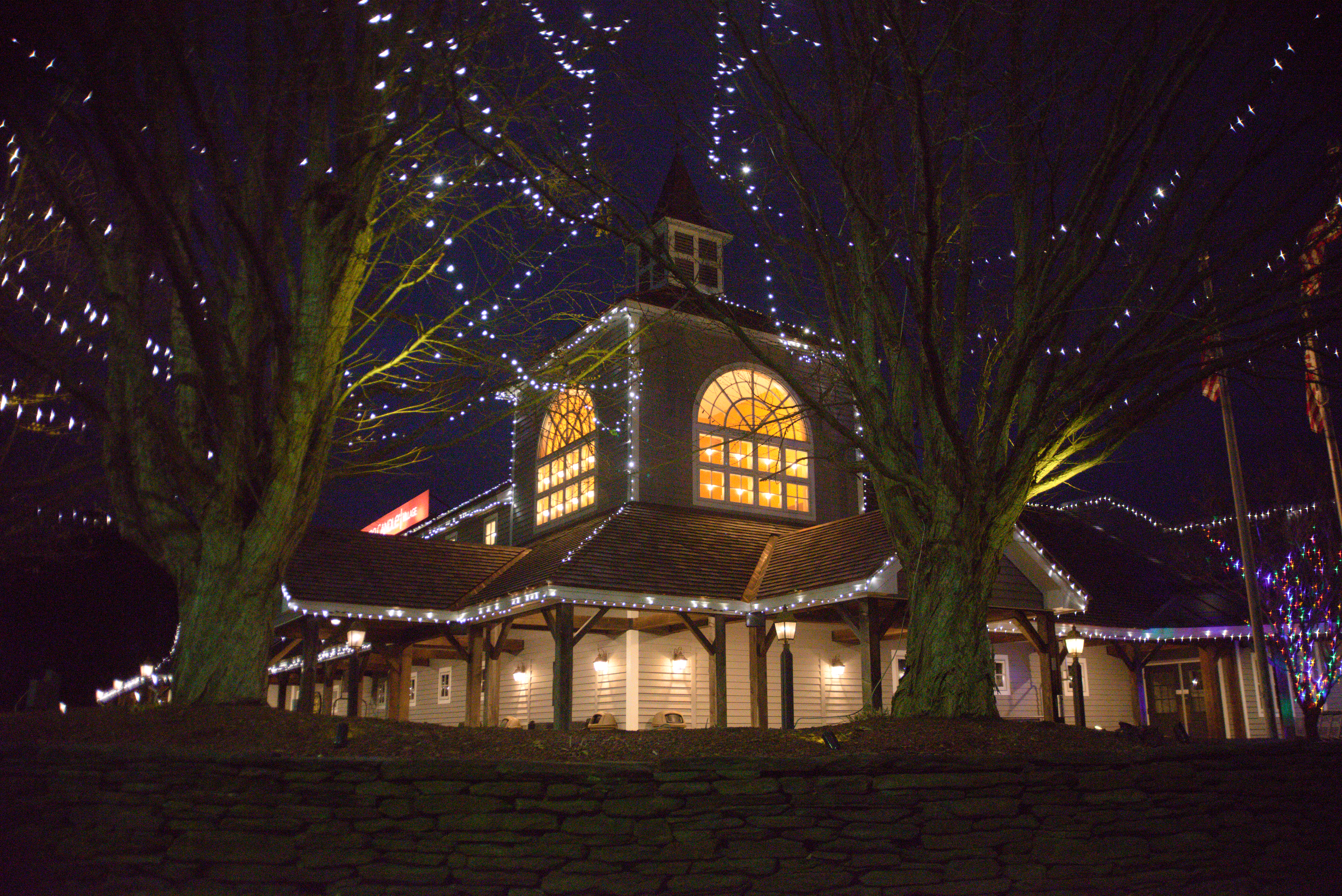
Yankee Candle flagship store in South Deerfield, MA

Yankee Candle's flagship store, which opened in 1982, is located in South Deerfield, Massachusetts. It features all available Yankee Candles as well as kitchen and home accessories, New England crafts, gifts and collectibles, a toy shop, picnic grounds and a "Bavarian Christmas Village" filled with decorated Christmas trees and a toy train that runs through to Santa's Workshop, where animated elves and an 'assembly line' for wooden vehicles surround Santa Claus's desk. Visitors can dip their own candles in a specially equipped area, make wax molds of their hands, or create their own unique candle. There is also a candle making museum and a Hillside Pizza cafe on site.

A second flagship store was opened in Williamsburg, Virginia, in 2005. The Williamsburg store closed for good in April 2021.

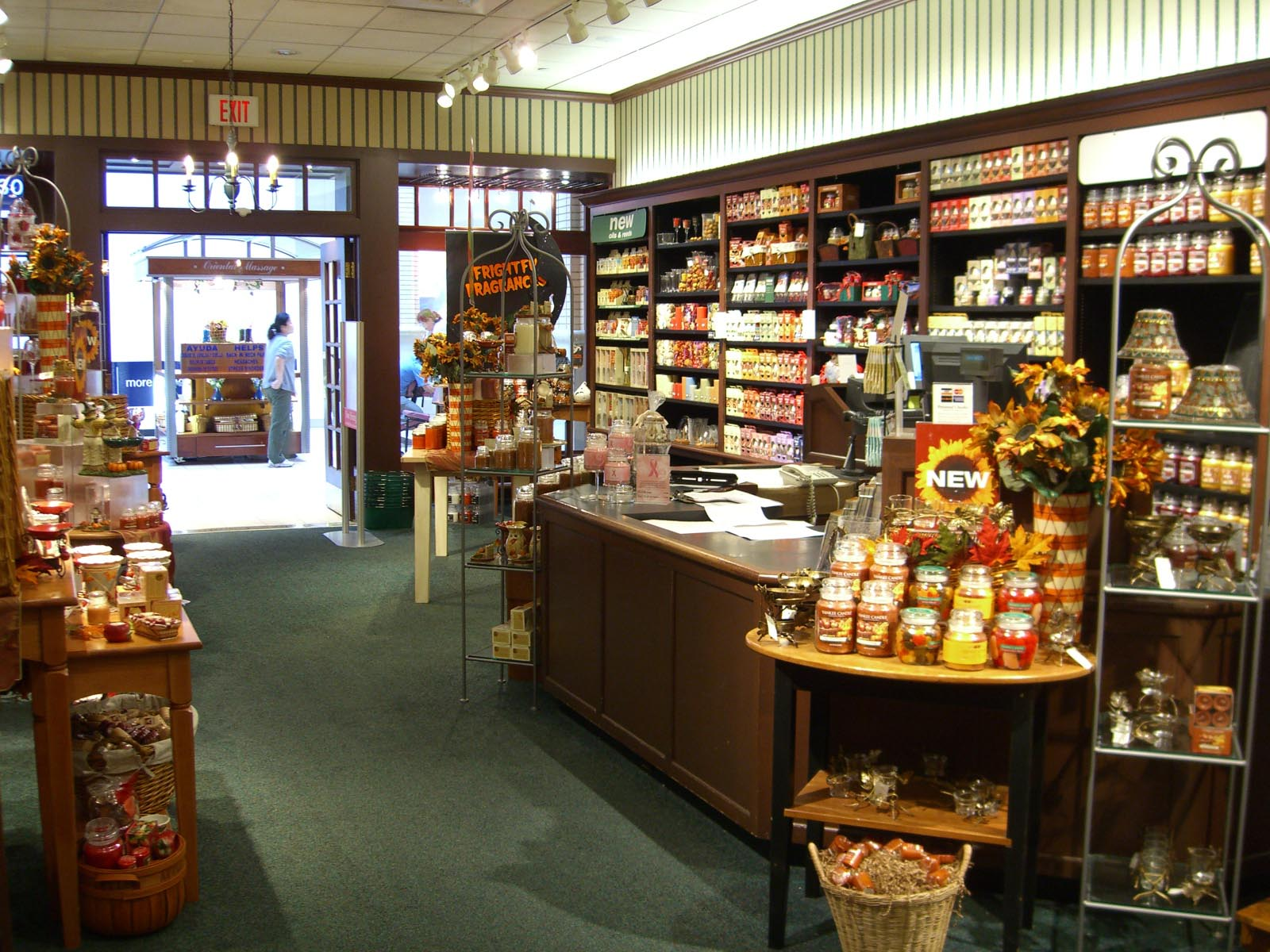
Interior of the Yankee Candle store in the Newport Center Mall in Jersey City, New Jersey

== Products ==
Yankee Candle Company markets an array of products, including Original Jar, Signature Tumbler, and 3-Wick candles of various scents; wax warmers and scented wax melts; Easy Meltcups (for use with the Scenterpiece wax warmers); candle accessories, such as candle holders, wick trimmers, candle snuffers, and jar toppers (for use with the Original Jar line of candles); filled votive candles (minis); ScentPlug units (scented wall plug-ins) and refills; car scents; room sprays; and more. Some scents are permanently available year-round, while others are limited edition or only sold seasonally.

== See also ==
- Yankee Candle Co. v. New England Candle Co.
