= Jerry W. Levin =

American businessman

- Born: 1944 (age 81–82); United States
- Education: University of Michigan, University of Chicago
- Occupation: Businessman
- Known for: Corporate turnaround specialist and chairman of JW Levin Partners LLC
- Spouse: Carol Levin

Jerry W. Levin (born 1944) is an American businessman who is known as a turnaround expert and mergers and acquisitions specialist. He held leadership positions in many of the companies that he helped turn round. He is chairman and chief executive officer of JW Levin Partners LLC, and serves on the board of directors of Ecolab, Saks and U.S. Bancorp.

== Early life and education ==
Levin graduated from the University of Michigan with B.S.E. degrees in Electrical Engineering and Mathematics and received an MBA from the University of Chicago in 1968.

== Career ==
=== Pillsbury ===
From 1974 to 1989, Levin worked for the Pillsbury Company. In his initial capacity as head of corporate development, Levin completed hundreds of mergers, acquisitions and divestitures. Some of the transactions he led included Häagen-Dazs, Green Giant, Totino's Pizza, Steak and Ale, Chart House, and American Beauty Macaroni. Levin also became the chief executive officer of several operating units within Pillsbury, including Häagen-Dazs and the second largest restaurant group in the U.S. (comprising Burger King, Steak and Ale, Bennigan's, Chart House and Godfather's Pizza).

=== Coleman ===
From 1989 until 1991, Levin was the chief executive officer of The Coleman Company, Inc., or Coleman. During his tenure as their chief executive officer, he divested non-strategic businesses to devote resources to their core camping business. He returned as chief executive officer of Coleman from 1997 until the sale of Coleman to Sunbeam Corporation in 1998.

=== Revlon ===
From 1991 until 1997, Levin was the chief executive officer of Revlon, Inc. When he joined Revlon, it was suffering from significant losses and debt load, and had a number three, and declining, market share in the United States mass market for color cosmetics. By the end of his tenure as chief executive officer, the firm had been restructured with its debt load significantly reduced and the number one market share in the United States mass market for color cosmetics. Levin oversaw the divestiture of non-strategic businesses, and the development and launch of several new products and brands, including Colorstay.

=== American Household ===
From June 1998 until January 2005, Levin served as chairman and chief executive officer of American Household, Inc. (formerly named Sunbeam), the holding company for Coleman, Sunbeam Products, Inc., Coleman Powermate, Inc., and First Alert, Inc. He was hired after the termination of Al Dunlap with Sunbeam facing numerous significant financial, operational and legal issues, and restructured Sunbeam’s operations during 1999 and 2000; in 2001, he led Sunbeam through a chapter 11 restructuring. American Household, Inc., was sold in two separate transactions during 2004 and at the time of its sale, its businesses were the leading or one of the leading businesses in the markets they served.

=== JW Levin Partners & Sharper Image ===
While at JW Levin Partners, a private management and investment firm, Levin was chairman of Sharper Image Corporation from September 2006 to April 2008 and interim chief executive officer of the firm from September 2006 through April 2007.

On February 19, 2008, the company filed for Chapter 11 bankruptcy, as a result low sales, aggravated by a decline in consumer spending and negative publicity surrounding its Ionic Breeze air purifiers.[13] Some analysts concluded Levin was responsible, having ignored any advice or wisdom from Thalheimer, and previous management.

On April 10, 2008, Levin resigned as a member and chairman of the board to join other investors in acquiring some or all of the company’s businesses or assets.[14][15] through JWL Partners Acquisition Corp., a SPAC, or Special Purpose Acquisition Company, submitted an IPO filing. The filing showed $200 million proceeds targeted. The underwriting group was listed as Credit Suisse and Ladenburg Thalmann & Co. They applied to list under the ticker “JWL.U” on the American Stock Exchange. The filing stated that the blank check corporation intended to acquire or acquire control of one or more businesses.[19][20] On December 22, 2008, however, JWL Partners Acquisition withdrew its IPO due to poor market conditions, and the faltering U.S. and Global economies.[21] This made Levin seem to be more bluster than substance.

==== Timeline at Sharper Image ====
A few months after taking the chairman role of Sharper Image, he helped oust founder Richard Thalheimer as CEO, who later also resigned as chairman. Levin then served as interim CEO of Sharper Image from September 2006 until April 2007. In that position his compensation was $750,000. CNET News reported that for years, Sharper Image's "management failed miserably at trying to turn the company around," not just during Levin's tenure.

Motley Fool published an article on March 17, 2007, with a section entitled "Sharper Image's dull deal," in which it scrutinized and criticized the Sharper Image's compensation arrangement with Levin, despite the fact that compensation and employment also covered other personnel from JW Levin Partners LLC, not just Levin. The article reported:

"Worse still is the sweet deal Sharper Image ... gave to interim CEO Jerry Levin. After reporting a 24% decline in same-store sales for February, the ailing retailer effectively doubled his salary.... Let's do the math. Unless Sharper Image hires another CEO before the end of June, Levin will be due $700,000, plus $83,333 for 25 days of service in September. And that's on top of stock options and the $750,000 in cash that he's due per his first contract. But my problem isn't so much with Levin's level of compensation as with his terms. Remember, every dollar of Levin's raise is paid in advance.... Those are extremely generous and unsettling terms."

Less than a year later, on February 19, 2008, the company filed for Chapter 11 bankruptcy. It blamed low sales, aggravated by a decline in consumer spending and negative publicity surrounding its Ionic Breeze air purifiers, dating years back to Thalheimer's leadership time.

On April 10, 2008, Levin resigned as a member and chairman of the board of the company to pursue participating with other investors to acquire some or all of the company’s businesses or assets. But, as has been pointed out,

"Levin hasn't made a lot of money for the investors of Sharper Image he's teamed up with so far, including hedge fund Ramius Capital, which helped bring him in as a director, and Clinton Group, which announced a large stake in December."

Under Levin, the company's stock price had fallen from about $40 three years prior to about 23 cents (a "paltry" $3.6 million market capitalization) at the time of his departure, on the over-the-counter pink sheets.

On February 8, 2008, directly before he announced the Sharper Image bankruptcy filing, JWL Partners Acquisition Corp., a SPAC, or special-purpose acquisition company, submitted an IPO filing. The filing showed $200 million proceeds targeted. The underwriting group was listed as Credit Suisse and Ladenburg Thalmann. They applied to list under the ticker “JWL.U” on the American Stock Exchange. The filing stated that the blank check corporation intended to acquire or acquire control of one or more businesses. On December 22, 2008, however, JWL Partners Acquisition withdrew its IPO due to poor market conditions, and the faltering U.S. and Global economies.

== Other positions ==
Levin has held positions at Ecolab Inc. where Levin serves as lead director and chairman of the Governance Committee; U.S. Bancorp where Levin serves as lead director and chairman of the Compensation Committee; JW Levin Partners LLC; Saks Incorporated where he serves as a member of the Audit Committee and the Finance Committee; Wilton Brands, Inc; he also serves on the board of the Recanati Graduate School of Business Administration in Israel.

== Philanthropy ==
Levin has served as the chair of the board of the UJA-Federation of New York since 2007. UJA is the world’s largest local philanthropy, serving over 4.5 million individuals in New York, in Israel, and around the world each year through more than 100-health, human-service, educational and community service agencies.

First engaged in UJA-Federation activities in 1991, Levin moved through a variety of capacities to chair of the Board, As chair of the board, Levin is the leader of UJA-Federation’s Annual Campaign. At the opening event of 2008, held in late September, although financial crises had occurred in many Wall Street financial institutions, $43 million was raised, exceeding last years’ efforts by $2 million.
