= Sunbeam CG =

Waffle iron

The Sunbeam CG waffle iron evolved from the Sunbeam Model W-1 and Model W-2 waffle irons of the 1940s.

== Overview ==
Introduced in 1955, the CG maintained the inner workings of the W-2, but had sleek modern styling. The CG features removable plates, allowing the waffle plate to be removed so it can be replaced by a sandwich grilling plate. The sandwich grilling plates also allow the CG to be used as a griddle or hot plate, in effect having three appliances in one.
