= Richard Thalheimer =

American entrepreneur and investor

Richard Jay Thalheimer
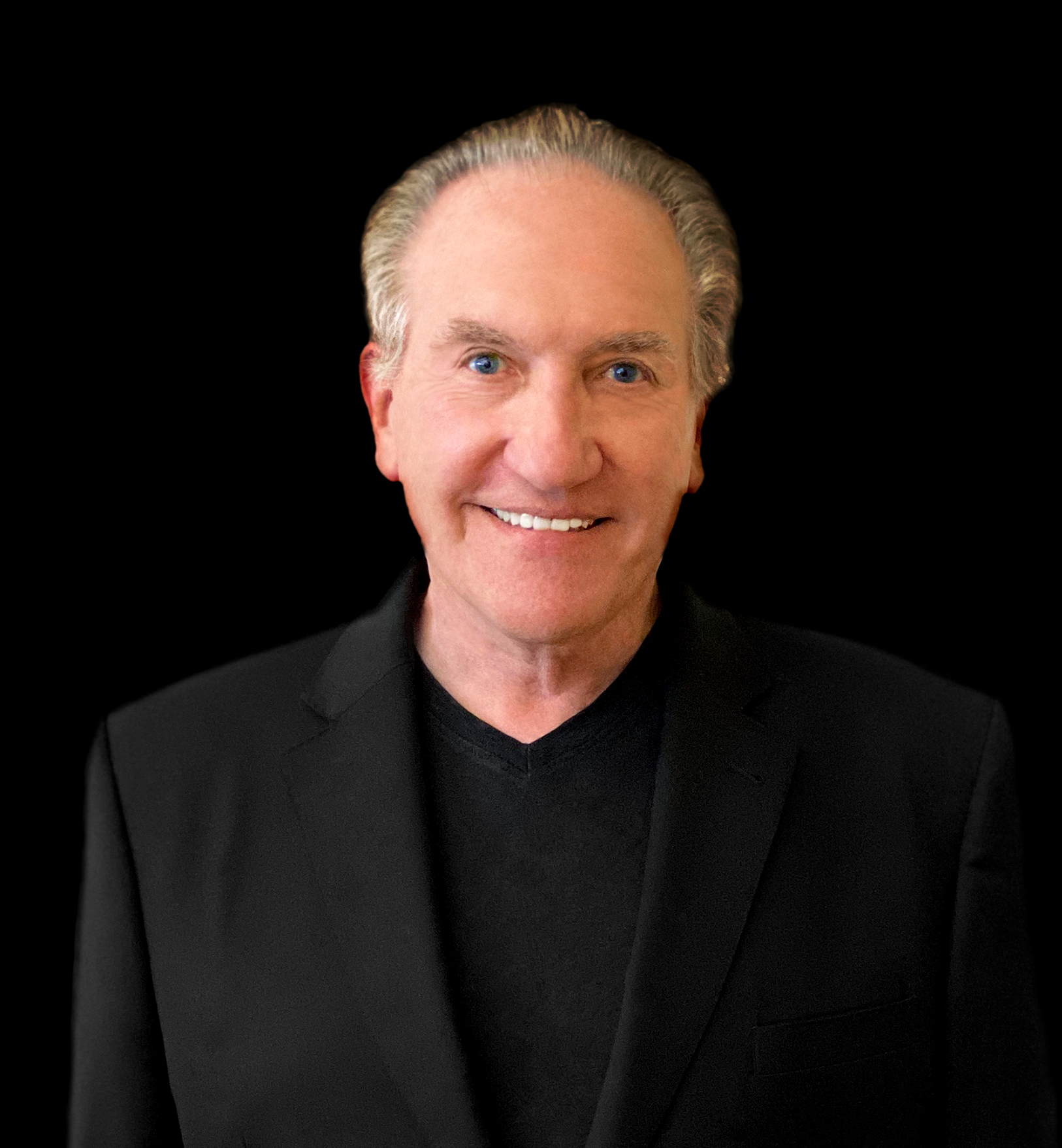
- Born: Little Rock, Arkansas
- Education: Yale University; San Francisco's University of California, Hastings College of the Law
- Occupations: Entrepreneur, lawyer, author, investor.
- Known for: Founder of The Sharper Image
- Website: https://RichardThalheimer.com

Richard Thalheimer is an American entrepreneur and investor. He is the founder and former CEO of the US-based consumer brand The Sharper Image. He established The Sharper Image in 1977, after taking an interest in watches. The early watch designs were inspired by a $69 watch that he owned, and he advertised his watch range in Runner's World magazine. The success of the watch advertisement led to the inaugural distribution of The Sharper Image catalog in 1979. Thalheimer took his company public in 1987 on the Nasdaq exchange.

The San Francisco-based company grew from three employees in the late 1970s, to 195 stores, a staff of 4,000 and revenues of $750 million. Thalheimer left the company in 2006. After leaving his role at The Sharper Image, Thalheimer started his own online retail business in 2007, RichardSolo.

== Early life ==
Thalheimer's family owned The Blass Department Store, which for many years was Arkansas' largest department store. He was born and raised in Little Rock, Arkansas.

After graduating from Hall High School in Little Rock, he left for New Haven and graduated from Yale University in 1970. He entered San Francisco's University of California, Hastings College of the Law the following year, graduated with a J.D. degree, and was admitted to the California Bar in July 1974. After graduating from law school in 1974, he practiced law in San Francisco for a year.

== Career ==
=== The Sharper Image ===
After graduating from law school in 1974, Thalheimer passed the California bar exam and practiced law in San Francisco for a year. While still studying law, Thalheimer at the age of 24 started a part-time office supply business, named Thalheimer Business Systems. Based in San Francisco, he started the supply business with $500 worth of copier paper. He later renamed his venture The Sharper Image. The rebrand was to help promote the quality of the copier paper and toner sold by his business.

After rebranding to The Sharper Image, Thalheimer stated in interviews that he had a desire to transform the business into a mail-order retail empire. He then began to study tech products that could be supplied by the business. His first idea was digital watches, after seeing a $300 Seiko watch. He spotted that some wealthy runners were using the Seiko, but many everyday runners would never have been able to afford the price tag. He took a flight to Las Vegas to visit a trade show, where he came across his first product, a wholesale digital watch. The watch manufacturer was based in Taiwan and was looking to distribute their product in the United States. Thalheimer purchased a watch and gave it to the head of his run club. He tested it running, cycling, and swimming. The watch held up to the challenge and Thalheimer decided to start distributing the watch. He believed it could be marketed as a similar product to the more expensive Seiko. The product was marketed directly to runners in Runner's World, with a full-page ad offering the watch at $69. The ad contained a large photo of the famous San Francisco runner Walt Stack. He generated $5,000 in profits from the watch and marketing campaign and began to repeat the process with other products and became a millionaire at the age of 27. The process became successful enough for Thalheimer to decide to launch his own catalog in 1979. He stated to The Hustle magazine, it was a high tech catalog of devices no one knew they needed.

Over the coming years, Thalheimer promoted products through magazine ads and catalog mailings. The Sharper Image regularly introduced new products to its line, and they were often seen as innovative. In the 1980s, Thalheimer introduced many products to the mass market, including the first cordless telephone. Other products included the first telephone answering machine, the first hand-held microcomputer, the first children's two-wheel Razor scooter, and the Ionic Breeze air purifier.

By the mid-1990s, the company became known for selling "quirky gadgets" and with the rise in electronic devices in homes, the company grew exponentially. During the opening of a Sharper Image store on Sutter Street in San Francisco in 1996, Thalheimer gave a presentation with NeXT Computer founder, Steve Jobs. Thalheimer spoke about how he witnessed Jobs' presentation earlier that year at WebMania, where he presented NeXt's dynamic web page builder. Thalheimer during his speech stated that at the time he thought "I gotta have this." Two months later, The Sharper Image launched its online catalog, which was built in partnership with NeXT Computers. Jobs presented The Sharper Image website to a select group of people in the store, explaining that thousands of webpages could be built depending on information about that user stored in a database. While NeXT Computer was using dynamic webpages with other clients, it is believed this is the first time it was used on this scale within retail. Jobs explained during the presentation that he and Thalheimer would "continue to enhance it, but it's already way ahead of anything else that is out there."

Later, Jobs presented the software at a number of expos, using The Sharper Image's website as an example. In some cases, Thalheimer also presented a short segment on how the website had allowed the company to transition from a traditional catalog model to online. At Internet World expo in 1996, Thalheimer presented a segment during Jobs' speech about dynamic web pages. Thalheimer stated that The Sharper Image spent $35 million in 1995 to distribute 2 million catalogs each month to its clients. He explained that the web catalog would completely transform how they did business. The partnership established between Thalheimer and Jobs went onto become what today is seen as modern-day ecommerce. At the time, some magazines such as Wired spoke about the technology used by The Sharper Image and how Jobs' innovations were likely to change the retail sector forever. In the coming years, the model was offered and reproduced at other large retailers across the United States.

Thalheimer announced that The Sharper Image was introducing a device called the Ionic Breeze in 1998. The device was an air purifier which made numerous innovations in the market. After the 3.0 version was released in 2003, The Times newspaper reported "unlike most air purifiers it is silent," which was seen as a revolutionary step in the market at the time.

In 1999, Thalheimer's vision for e-commerce saw The Sharper Image increase its online revenues 243% in a single year. The strong online performance allowed the business to continue expanding and launch new innovative products. Thalheimer moved from managing the day-to-day operations that year to spending 4 days a week with the design team coming up with new concepts and products. The company also focused on their store offerings during this period, and were one of the first United States retailers to offer the Razor scooter. According to an interview in CNN, Thalheimer first saw the scooter at a Hong Kong trade show and signed a distribution deal 7 months before any other retailers in the United States stocked the scooter.

In 2006, Thalheimer left the company after 29 years. Thalheimer remained on the board until 2007 when he sold his remaining shares in the business. Thalheimer appeared on numerous prime-time television shows including Late Night with David Letterman and The Joan Rivers Show. He was featured in the Citibank Diner's Club network commercial.

=== RichardSolo ===
After leaving The Sharper Image, Thalheimer founded RichardSolo in 2007. As soon as he founded the business, he continued where he left off with Sharper Image and began to invent and distribute useful gadgets. It began in 2007 when he signed an exclusivity agreement to distribute a backup battery pack for smart devices, such as iPhones. By 2008, the company had grown to a turnover of $4 million, simply by offering a single product. Thalheimer recognized that the success wasn't only the charging of a phone on the go, but also the notoriously poor battery life of the iPhone. RichardSolo also launched other products, such as the Back-Up, which was a back support.

=== The Sharper Fund ===
In 2010, Thalheimer devoted his full-time energies to managing his stock portfolio and began to study with the Najarian Brothers. In 2015, Thalheimer launched his family office fund, which is known today as The Sharper Fund. The Sharper Fund recorded gains of 96% during 2019. Through the first half of 2020, recorded gains of 73%.

During a podcast interview, Thalheimer spoke about his simple, yet effective option trading strategies and public stock predictions. He compared his investing strategy to how he created and marketed Sharper Image products; looking at long term benefits and market factors at the time of investment.

Then, he gave an example of his investment in Chipotle. The company suffered a sharp fall in share price after numerous food poisoning issues. Thalheimer stated that after the fall in share price, Chipotle hired the ex-Taco Bell CEO, Brian Niccol. He believed that Niccol's expertise would change the culture at Chipotle and subsequently they would see the share price return to its highs of $750 a share. At the time of the podcast interview, Thalheimer stated he had made large returns due to the increase he had seen in the restaurant chain's share price.

In December 2018, Thalheimer was interviewed on a couple of occasions about his position on Tesla's stock price. Thalheimer stated in an interview that he had always held a bullish view on the stock after owning four Teslas since 2010. He stated that many of the critical views by both analysts and industry experts, such as Bob Lutz, were looking at market conditions incorrectly.

He believed that many were overlooking the technology in Teslas in the same way analysts and experts ignored how revolutionary the iPod would become. He also stated that his belief that Tesla was in a stronger position than Ford and other traditional motor manufacturers.

Thalheimer announced in early 2020 that Tesla stock was up almost 200% since he made the call in late 2018. The Sharper Fund also recorded a 93% gain during 2019. During the COVID-19 pandemic, Thalheimer announced that he was long on Restoration Hardware. Towards summer 2020, it was announced that the stock was up 47%.

== Design ==
The Sharper Image based an "invention lab" in Novato, California that had the sole purpose of designing and developing new products. It was Thalheimer's vision to design products and during the last decade at The Sharper Image, he spent a lot of time at the Novato facility. At its peak, the facility employed 15 people and was granted 300 patents.

== Author ==
Creating Your Own Sharper Image is a business book written by Thalheimer. In this book he shares his techniques for building a successful business.
