= Sunbeam Products =

American brand of electric home appliances

Sunbeam Products, Inc.
- Type: Subsidiary
- Industry: Consumer products
- Founded: 1897; 129 years ago as Chicago Flexible Shaft Company
- Headquarters: Boca Raton, Florida, United States
- Area served: Worldwide
- Key people: Andrew C. Hill (CEO & President)
- Products: Kitchen appliances Bedding; Home and health products
- Total assets: Sunbeam Australia
- Parent: Newell Brands
- Website: www.sunbeam.com

Sunbeam Products is an American company founded in 1897 that has produced electric home appliances under the Sunbeam name since 1910. Its products have included the Mixmaster mixer, the Sunbeam CG waffle iron, Coffeemaster (1938–1964) and the fully automatic T20 toaster.

The company has endured a long history of struggles, including in 2001, when it filed for bankruptcy and was also found to have committed massive accounting fraud, for which it was subject to SEC investigation. In 2002, Sunbeam emerged from bankruptcy as American Household, Inc. (AHI). Sunbeam was owned by Jarden Consumer Solutions after Jarden's acquisition in 2004, which was itself later purchased by Newell Rubbermaid (now Newell Brands) in 2015.

== History ==
=== Early history ===
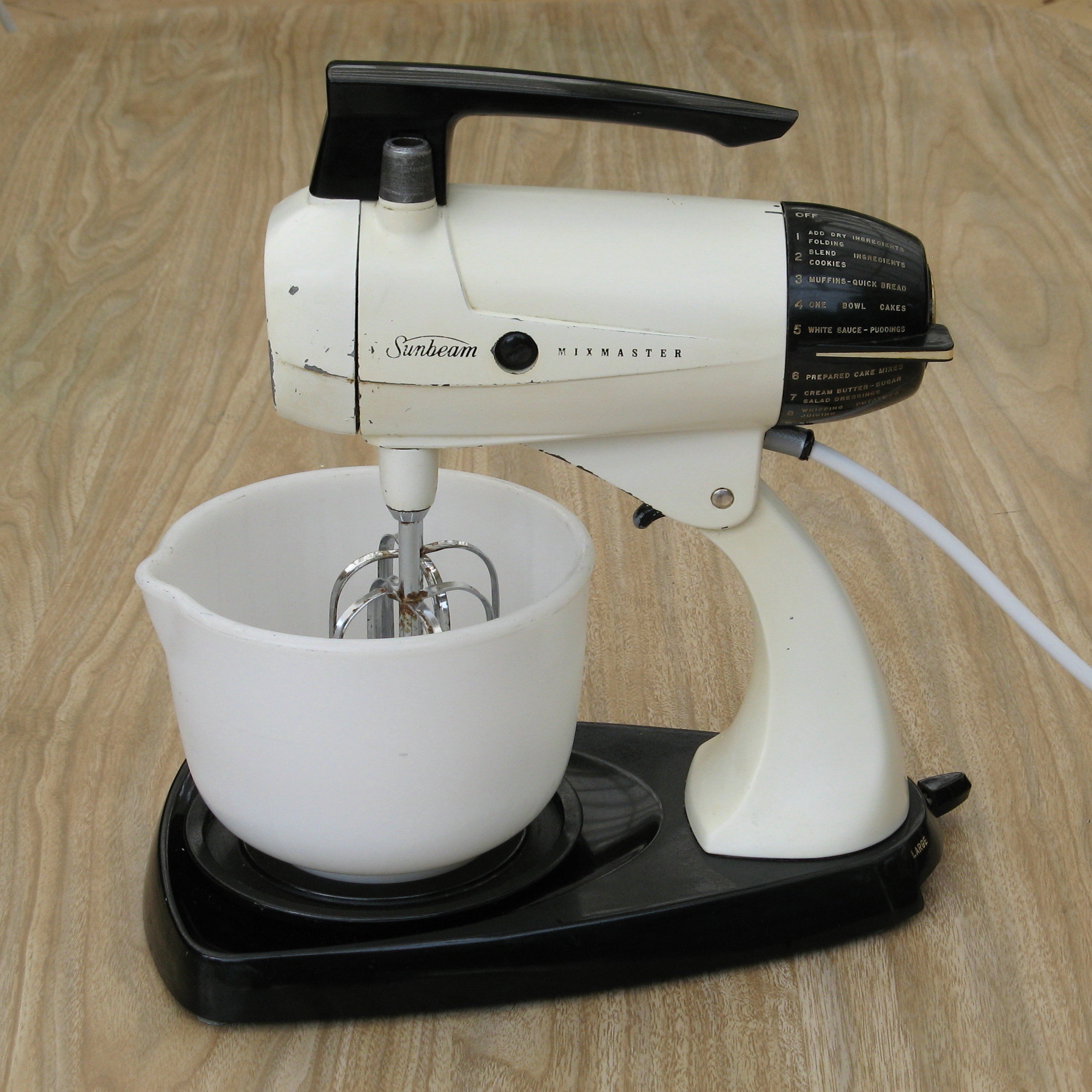
Sunbeam's flagship Mixmaster (model A24, c. 1969–72)

In 1897 John K. Stewart and Thomas J. Clark incorporated their Chicago Flexible Shaft Company, which made horse trimming and sheep shearing machinery. In 1910 the company produced its first Sunbeam branded household appliance, the Princess Electric Iron (with an option to buy a fireproof metal storage box). The name "Sunbeam" came from a company wide contest to rebrand its growing home appliance business. Edwin J. Gallagher (1897–1983), a buyer and traffic manager for the company, won the contest and received a check for $1,000. The company did not officially change its corporate name to Sunbeam until 1946.

In 1928, the company's head designer, Swedish immigrant Ivar Jepson, alongside Bernard Alton Graham, invented the Mixmaster mixer. Introduced in 1930, it was the first mechanical mixer with two detachable beaters whose blades interlocked. Several attachments were available for the Mixmaster, including a juice extractor, drink mixer, meat grinder–food chopper, and slicer–shredder. Other accessories include: dough hooks, blender, meat mincer, fine and coarse graters and came with 2 bowl sizes. The bowls rotated, sitting atop a free-running turntable and being driven by the 'edge' beater via a plastic cupped washer on the tip of the beater using friction drive against the sharply sloping side of the bowls near the bottoms. The mixer simply unclips from the base stand so it could be used as a hand mixer too. The Mixmaster became the company's flagship product for the next forty years, but the brand also became known for the designs, mainly by Robert Davol Budlong, of electric toasters, coffee makers, and electric shavers, among other appliances.

The Mixmaster universe, a cosmological model of the early universe, was named after the Mixmaster product.

=== Growth ===
Sunbeam acquired Rain King Sprinkler Company producing a popular lawn sprinkler line of the 1950s and 1960s. Meanwhile, Sunbeam continued to expand outside of Chicago. In 1960, it acquired John Oster Manufacturing Company, best known for its Osterizer blenders. By the end of the 1970s, as the leading American manufacturer of small appliances, Sunbeam enjoyed about $1.3 billion in annual sales and employed nearly 30,000 people worldwide. In 1981, after Sunbeam was bought by Allegheny International Inc. of Pittsburgh, most of the Chicago-area factories were closed and the headquarters moved to downtown Pittsburgh. Under Allegheny International's ownership, Sunbeam became the world's largest maker of small appliances through much of the 1980s. Allegheny International moved its headquarters into a 32-floor signature skyscraper in Pittsburgh. During this time, the companies Allegheny controlled included John Zink Company (manufactured air pollution control devices) and Hanson Scale (manufactured bathroom scales and other balance machines).

Allegheny's four principal divisions, including Sunbeam, went into decline during the late-1980s. Because Sunbeam-Oster was one of the most important divisions, responsible for nearly half of all sales, stockholders became very concerned about the leadership of the company. In 1986, stockholders accused the chairman and CEO, Robert Buckley, of misappropriating funds. Buckley's successor, Oliver Travers, downsized the company considerably and, by 1988, it was essentially just Sunbeam and Oster. The decline continued, worsened by the stock market crash of October 1987, and Allegheny filed for Chapter 11 bankruptcy. In the fall of 1989, an investment group called Japonica Partners purchased the remains of Allegheny for $250 million ($649.3 million today) in a hostile takeover. The company was renamed Sunbeam-Oster Company, Inc. The business was then divided into four divisions: Outdoor Products, Household Products, Specialty Products, and International Sales. The company headquarters were moved again, from Pittsburgh to Providence, Rhode Island, and then, finally, to Fort Lauderdale, Florida. By late 1991, Sunbeam-Oster's sales had increased by seven percent, enabling it to make the Fortune 500 list.

=== Fraud investigation and bankruptcy ===
In 1996, Albert J. Dunlap was recruited to be CEO and chairman of Sunbeam-Oster. Dunlap quickly announced that he would lay off half of Sunbeam-Oster's work force among other measures. In 1997, Sunbeam reported massive increases in sales for its various backyard and kitchen items. Dunlap purchased controlling interest in Coleman and Signature Brands (acquiring Mr. Coffee and First Alert) during this time. Stock soared to $52 a share. However, industry insiders were suspicious that seasonal products, such as barbecue grills, showed unusually high off-season sales. An internal investigation revealed that Sunbeam was in severe crisis, and that Dunlap had encouraged violations of accepted accounting rules. Dunlap was fired, and under CEO Jerry W. Levin, the company filed for Chapter 11 bankruptcy protection in 2001.

Soon after Sunbeam filed for bankruptcy, the U.S. Securities and Exchange Commission (SEC) sued Dunlap and four other Sunbeam executives, alleging that they had engineered a massive accounting fraud. The SEC said $60 million of Sunbeam's supposed record $189 million earnings for 1997 were the result of fraudulent accounting. It also said that Dunlap had falsely created the impression of massive losses in 1996 to make it look as if Sunbeam made a dramatic turnaround the next year. Along with Dunlap and several other officers, the SEC sued Phillip Harlow at Sunbeam's accounting firm, Arthur Andersen. Dunlap was ultimately banned from serving again as an officer or director of a public company.

=== Emerging from bankruptcy and acquisition ===
In 2002, Sunbeam emerged from bankruptcy as American Household, Inc. (AHI), a privately held company. Its former household products division became the subsidiary Sunbeam Products, Inc. AHI was purchased in September 2004 by the Jarden Corporation, of which it was a subsidiary.

=== 2005 to present ===
Jarden continued to grow its brands, purchasing the Holmes Group in 2005, K2 in 2007, and Mapa Spontex in 2009. More recently, Jarden purchased Aero International and Quickie Manufacturing. As of 2015, Sunbeam batteries were made in China and imported into the United States by Greenbrier International and into Canada by DTSC Imports for Dollar Tree stores. Jarden Corporation was purchased by Newell Rubbermaid to form Newell Brands in 2016. Sunbeam operates Holmes Products and licenses some of its products, including its heated bedding and irons to SEG Products, a Montreal based consumer goods company.

==== Recalls ====
In late 2025, the firm issued a recall for 1.29 million units of an Oster-branded countertop oven due to a door defect posing a "serious burn hazard".

== See also ==
- Conair Corporation
- Sunbeam Corporation Limited (Australian Brand)
