= Americans for Common Cents =

Organization

- Abbreviation: ACC
- Formation: 1990
- Type: Interest group
- Headquarters: Washington, D.C.
- Executive director: Mark Weller
- Website: pennies.org

Americans for Common Cents is an organization based in Washington, D.C. that lobbies in favor of keeping the United States penny in circulation. It was established in 1990. The organization has conducted surveys and organized advertising campaigns in support of the continuing production of the penny. Its executive director, Mark Weller, has argued that eliminating the penny would lead to retailers rounding prices mainly up, not down, leading to inflation, but has offered little evidence to support this assertion. It is primarily funded by the zinc industry.

== History ==
The organization was established in 1990. That year, they commissioned a study which concluded that if the penny were eliminated, rounding purchases up to the nearest five cents could cost consumers $1.5 billion over a five-year period. In 2000, the organization asked Raymond Lombra to conduct a study on the effects of eliminating the penny on the rounding of prices. Lombra did so, and his study estimated that consumers would pay an extra $600 million per year in rounded-up costs were the penny to be eliminated. This averages to $1.94 per American based on a population of 309 million in 2010.

In 2006, the organization joined Virgin Mobile and Kevin Federline to launch a publicity campaign in support of the penny, in which Federline emerged from a red truck wearing an Abraham Lincoln mask. A Virgin representative said Federline became interested in this topic because he likes text messaging.

== Funding ==
Americans for Common Cents receives funding from about 40 separate organizations, including Artazn (formerly Jarden Zinc Products), the company that sells zinc coin blanks to the U.S. Mint. In 2012, Weller, a lobbyist, was paid $340,000 by Jarden Zinc to discuss issues relating to minting with members of Congress and the US Mint. Weller has acknowledged this funding, saying that "We make no secret that one of our major sponsors is a company that makes the zinc 'blanks' for pennies."

== Surveys ==
In 1990, the organization commissioned a survey which found that 62% of Americans opposed eliminating the penny. They commissioned another survey in 2012 which came to a similar conclusion; namely, that about two-thirds of Americans supported keeping the penny.
