= Artazn =

International coin manufacturing company

Artazn, formerly known as Jarden Zinc Products LLC. is a manufacturer of zinc products. The company is a subsidiary of One Rock Capital. The company is most notable for being the sole manufacturer of planchets used in the production of the United States penny. The company has resisted past efforts to eliminate the penny in the United States through an astroturf lobby organization called Americans for Common Cents.

== Products ==
The company's largest source of revenue comes from the production of coin blanks, having produced over 300 billion blanks at their Tennessee facility. The company also supplies zinc strips used in various cathodic protection, building, automotive, architectural, and specialty products. Such products include zinc galvanic anodes, LifeJacket, and LifeDowel automotive blade fuses, metal flashing, guttering systems, plumbing hardware, wall cladding, braille, organ pipes, counter tops, signs, and medals among other niche items.

=== Product development ===
Zinc's attributes and characteristics can be manipulated to create new zinc alloys. Jarden Zinc Products has a product development team that is tasked with creating new alloys that meet specific market needs.
