= List of generic and genericized trademarks =

The following three lists of generic and genericized trademarks are:

- marks that were originally legally protected trademarks, but have been genericized and have lost their legal status due to becoming generic terms,
- marks that have been abandoned and are now generic terms
- marks that are still legally protected as trademarks, at least in some jurisdictions

== List of former trademarks that have been genericized ==
The following partial list contains marks which were originally legally protected trademarks, but which have subsequently lost legal protection as trademarks by becoming the common name of the relevant product or service, as used both by the consuming public and commercial competitors. These marks were determined in court to have become generic. Some marks retain trademark protection in certain countries despite being declared generic in others.

Airfryer
Trademark owned by Philips in various jurisdictions, but invalidated in the United States due to its being merely a descriptive term, and withdrawn in the European Union.
Aspirin
Still a Bayer trademark name for acetylsalicylic acid in about 80 countries, including Canada and many countries in Europe, but declared generic in the U.S.
Cellophane
Still a registered trademark of Innovia Films Ltd in Europe and many other jurisdictions. Genericized in the U.S. Originally a trademark of DuPont. A thin, transparent sheet made of regenerated cellulose.
Circline
Originally a trademark of General Electric of ring shaped fluorescent lamps. Became generic in the United States and Canada.
Dry ice
Trademarked by the Dry Ice Corporation of America in 1925. A solid form of carbon dioxide.
Escalator
Originally a trademark of Otis Elevator Company and it was a registered trademark until 1950.
Flip phone
Originally a trademark of Motorola.
Flit gun
Originally trademarked as a dispenser for Flit, a brand of insecticide manufactured by the Standard Oil Company of New Jersey (later Exxon).
Heroin
Trademarked by Friedrich Bayer & Co in 1898. Trademark lost in some nations in the Treaty of Versailles, in 1919.
Hovercraft
Trademarked by Saunders-Roe.
Kerosene
A clear, flammable liquid derived from coal and bitumen. Originally coined around 1852 by Canadian geologist and physicist Abraham Gesner, and now referring to the general term for any similar form of lamp fuel.
Lanolin
Trademarked as the term for a preparation of water and the wax from sheep's wool.
Launderette
Coin laundry shop. Telecoin-Bendix trademark, for coin laundries of Telecoin-adapted Bendix machines.
Laundromat
Coin laundry shop. Westinghouse trademark, registered in the U.S. in the 1940s (automatic washing machine) and 1950s (coin laundry) but now expired.
Linoleum
Floor covering, originally coined by Frederick Walton in 1864, and ruled as generic following a lawsuit for trademark infringement in 1878; probably the first product name to become a generic term.
Linotype
Form of hot-metal typesetting; formerly in common use, before phototypesetting and digital typesetting replaced it for all but museum purposes
Lyocell
Originally a brand name owned by Lenzing, an Austrian-based company, for a viscose-type fiber fabricated via the NMMO process. In the meantime Lyocell is a generic name used by various manufacturers.
Mimeograph
Originally trademarked by Albert Dick. A low-cost printing press that works by forcing ink through a stencil onto paper.
Quonset
A trademark of the Great Lakes Steel Corporation for a brand of hemicylindrical prefabricated structures, first deployed at Quonset Point, Rhode Island
Sellotape
Sellotape is a British brand of transparent, cellulose-based, pressure-sensitive adhesive tape, and is the leading brand in the United Kingdom. Sellotape is generally used for joining, sealing, attaching and mending. The term has become a genericised trademark in the UK, Ireland, Australia, Nigeria, Ghana, New Zealand, Israel, India, Serbia, Japan, Croatia, Greece, Turkey, Malaysia, Macedonia, Zimbabwe, and South Africa, and is used much in the same way that Scotch tape came to be used in Canada, France, Italy and the United States, in referring to any brand of clear adhesive tape.
Spidola
A brand created by the Latvian manufacturer VEF, but widely used in the Soviet Union to refer to all transistor radios.
Teleprompter
The word TelePrompTer, with internal capitalization, originated in the 1950s as a trade name used by the TelePrompTer Corporation, for their television prompting apparatus.
Teletype
Form of long-distance communication formerly in common use, before newer digital methods replaced it for all but museum purposes
Thermos
Originally a trademark of Thermos GmbH (Germany), thermos has referred generically to vacuum-insulated containers in the U.S. since 1963. It remains a trademark in much of the rest of the world.
Trampoline
Originally a trademark of the Griswold-Nissen Trampoline & Tumbling Company.
Videotape
Originally trademarked by Ampex Corporation, an early manufacturer of audio and video tape recorders.

== List of former trademarks that have since become generic terms due to reasons other than genericization ==
The following partial list contains marks which were originally legally protected trademarks, but which have subsequently lost legal protection as trademarks due to abandonment, non-renewal or improper issuance (the generic term predated the registration). Some marks retain trademark protection in certain countries despite being generic in others.

Ani-Manga
Originally as a trademark of Viz Media which became an umbrella term for anime and manga after its trademark expired on October 28, 2016.
App Store
Trademark claimed by Apple Inc. for their digital distribution platform. Apple filed a lawsuit against Amazon.com over Appstore for Amazon, but abandoned the lawsuit after an early rejection of Apple's false advertising claim in the lawsuit. As part of the settlement, Apple gave Amazon a covenant not to sue, so that Amazon would drop its counterclaim to have the registration cancelled. As of June 2025, the trademark, reg. no. 4,829,304, remains "Issued and Active" at the U.S. Patent and Trademark Office.
Dumpster
Trademark was cancelled in 2015. Trademarked by Dempster Brothers, Inc. in 1963, dumpster is originally a portmanteau of the word dump and the last name Dempster. It originally appeared in the 1951 product name Dempster Dumpster, while related patents date back to 1937.
LP record
Used to refer to a phonograph record made of PVC and playing at a speed of 33 1/3 rpm. Originally a trademark of Columbia Records, introduced in 1948. Abbreviation for "Long Playing."
Multiball
Used to refer to a state on a pinball machine where two or more balls are present on the playfield simultaneously and can be accessed by the flippers. Trademarked by WMS Industries in 1981 as "Multi-ball" and by Templar Studios in 2000 as "Multiball." "Multiball" was abandoned as a trademark in 2001, and "Multi-ball" was canceled in 2002.
Super glue
Formerly trademarked by Loctite Corporation, but the trademark was canceled by a court ruling in 1981, which found that the term had always been generic. The term "The Original Super Glue" is still trademarked by Pacer Technology.
Super Hero
Formerly held jointly by Marvel Comics and DC Comics, the trademark was challenged by a comic book artist that argued the term had become generic. The USPTO cancelled the marks in September 2024.
Taco Tuesday
A social/family event or sales promotion relating to consuming tacos on a Tuesday; held by Gregory’s Restaurant and Bar in New Jersey and Taco John's in the other 49 states until 2023, when the companies abandoned their trademark registrations after Taco Bell filed petitions with the U.S. Patent and Trademark Office to cancel the marks.
Touch-tone
Dual tone multi-frequency telephone signaling; AT&T states "formerly a trademark of AT&T".
Webster's Dictionary
The publishers with the strongest link to the original are Merriam-Webster, but they have a trademark only on "Merriam-Webster", and other dictionaries are legally published as "Webster's Dictionary".
Yo-Yo
Still a Papa's Toy Co. Ltd. trademark name for a spinning toy in Canada, but was determined that the trademark was improperly issued.
ZIP Code
Originally registered as a United States Postal Service service mark but has since expired.
Zipper
Originally a trademark of B.F. Goodrich for use in rubber boots.

== List of protected trademarks frequently used as generic terms ==
Marks in this partial list are still legally protected as trademarks, at least in some jurisdictions, but are sometimes used by consumers in a generic sense. Unlike the names in the list above, these names are still widely known by the public as brand names, and are not used by competitors. Scholars disagree as to whether the use of a recognized trademark name for similar products can truly be called "generic", or if it is instead a form of synecdoche.

The previous list contains trademarks that have completely lost their legal status in some countries, while the following list contains marks which have been registered as trademarks, continue in use, and are actively enforced by their trademark owners. Writing guides such as the AP Stylebook advise writers to "use a generic equivalent unless the trademark is essential to the story".

Trademarked name	Generic name	Trademark owner	Notes
AdBlue	Diesel exhaust fluid	Verband der Automobilindustrie	Name is primarily used in Europe and North America.
Adrenaline	Epinephrine	Endo (previously Parke-Davis)	Widely referred to, in both technical and non-technical contexts, as "adrenaline", and in the BAN and EP systems.
Airfix	Plastic injection-moulded scale model kits	Hornby Railways	Still used widely in the UK to describe a scale model as it was the dominant brand at that time.
Allen wrench	Hex key	Apex Tool Group	Also known as an "Allen key" or "hex head wrench", and outside the USA by such brand names as "Inbus", "Unbrako", and "Brugola".
Aqua	Mineral water	Danone	Common in Indonesia as a genericized mark for any mineral water.
Aqua-lung	Open-circuit underwater breathing set with demand valve	See Aqua-lung#Trademark issues	Or nowadays often merely "scuba", or "air scuba", when there is a need to distinguish from rebreathers
AstroTurf	Artificial turf	Monsanto Company (formerly), AstroTurf, LLC	Also gave use to the term astroturfing.
Armco	Crash barrier	Cleveland-Cliffs	Armco barriers made from corrugated steel have long been the standard for crash barrier protection in the UK
Band-Aid	Adhesive bandage, plaster	Johnson & Johnson (formerly), Kenvue (part of Kimberly-Clark)	Often used as though generic by consumers in Canada, the U.S., Brazil, Australia, and New Zealand, though still legally trademarked.
Biro	Ballpoint pen	Société Bic	Used generically in colloquial British, Irish and Australian English, particularly for cheaper disposable pens, but remains a registered trademark. Derived from the name of the inventor, László Bíró.
Bobcat	Skid-steer loader	Bobcat Company	This usage is especially common in Australia. The Clark Equipment Company has successfully defended the trademark against dilution and genericization at least in two cases relating to domain names with the World Intellectual Property Organization.
Bubble Wrap	Inflated cushioning	Sealed Air	
Burqini	Swimsuit compatible with Islamic modesty requirements	Aheda Zanetti	Alternatively spelled "burkini", which is also trademarked.
Bush Hog	Rotary mower	Bush Hog, Inc.	
Canon	Photocopier or to make a photocopy	Canon Inc.	Like Xerox became a generic name for a photocopier in some countries, Canon became a generic name for it in Mongolia. As the Japanese company was the main exporter of photocopiers to this country, they are widely known as Mongolian: канон
Cashpoint	Automated teller machine, cash machine	Lloyds Bank	Commonly used in the UK to refer to any ATM or cash dispensing machine, regardless of which bank or company it is operated by.
Chain gun	Motor operated machine gun	Northrop Grumman	Also appears as a definition in the Oxford English Dictionary, describing it as "a machine gun that uses a motor-driven chain to power all moving parts"
ChapStick	Lip balm	Evermark	Used as a shorthand to refer to any brand of lip balm.
ChatGPT	Generative AI chatbot	OpenAI	
Christmas Seals	Christmas seal	American Lung Association	A Charity label or fundraising seal issued at Christmas time to fight tuberculosis or other lung disease. Trademark was taken in 1987 by ALA, who has issued National Christmas Seals in the US continuously since 1907, to prevent other US National charities from competing.
Chyron	On-Screen Graphics or Character Generator(CG)	ChyronHego Corporation	Hardware and software used in broadcasting for making lower thirds and other on screen graphics. Often used to refer to any kind of on screen graphics regardless of playout equipment.
Cigarette boat	Go-fast boat	Cigarette Racing	The nickname derived from fast powerboats that were designed to smuggle cigarettes fast and outrun law enforcement personnel. Trademark was taken following a founding of a company named after the nickname.
Clorox	Bleach	Clorox Company	
Coke	Cola, soft drink, pop, soda	Coca-Cola Company	Predominantly used in some parts of the US to refer to any cola (even that of another trademark). Still a trademark.
Colt	Revolver	Colt's Manufacturing Company, part of Colt CZ Group	A common choice of gun during the Wild West, it was used to describe any revolvers during the 19th century, regardless of brand.
Comic-Con	Comic book convention	San Diego Comic-Con	In 2014, San Diego Comic-Con sued the producers of a similarly named convention, contending infringement of its trademark. The case was decided by jury in December 2017, upholding "Comic-Con" as a trademark of SDCC.
Confort	Toilet paper	Softys	In Chile, used to refer to toilet paper.
Connollising	As a verb, to restore automobile leather interior	Connolly Leather	Often used by automobile enthusiasts and medias, when to describe restoring leather interiors, thanks to the high international reputation of the company.
Craisin	Dried cranberry	Ocean Spray	"Craisin" is often used synonymously with "dried cranberry", though a true dried cranberry does not have added sugar, while a Craisin does.
Crock-Pot	Slow cooker	Sunbeam Products, part of Newell Brands	"Crock pot" and "crockpot" are common synonyms used by cooks to describe any slow cooker.
Cuisinart	Food processor	Conair	Sometimes used in the U.S. to refer to any food processor, but still a trademark.
Cutex	Nail polish	Revlon	Mostly used in the Philippines to refer to nail polish, regardless of brand. Often spelled as "Kyutix", "Kutex", or "Kutix." The Shanghainese term of nail polish, "蔻丹", is derived from "Cutex", because Cutex is a well-known brand of nail polish in pre-1949 China, although it's not commonly seen in post-1980s China.
Cyberpunk	Subgenre of science fiction	CD Projekt and Sony Music Entertainment Europe	The term for the genre dates to the early 1980s with the Cyberpunk franchise created by Mike Pondsmith and his R. Talsorian Games (RTG) first published in 1988. In the US, CD Projekt owns all rights to the term with RTG licensing it for its tabletop role-playing games.
Decora	Rocker light switch	Leviton	Frequently used in the United States to refer to any rocker light switch regardless of manufacturer, but still trademarked.
Dictaphone	Dictation machine	Nuance Communications, part of Microsoft	Used to describe devices that are used to record speech such as handheld voice recorders.
Dobro	Resonator guitar	Gibson Brands	Used to describe any Resonator Guitar, especially the single cone "spider-bridge" design originally by the Dobro company.
Doll Instant Noodle	Instant noodles	Winner Food Products	"Doll Instant Noodle" (公仔麵) is commonly referred in Hong Kong for instant noodles. Winner Food Products (永南食品) was acquired by its former arch-competitor Nissin Foods in 1989.
Dormobile	Motorhome	Bedford Vehicles, then Dormobile (Folkestone) Ltd	Widely used in the United Kingdom to describe any motorhomes. This article by the BBC is an example of the term being used generically.
Doshirak	Instant noodles	Paldo Co. Ltd., previously Korea Yakult	Used in Russia to refer to any kind of instant noodles.
Dremel	Rotary Tool	Robert Bosch GmbH	Small handheld rotary tools are often called dremels or dremel clones.
Durex	Adhesive tape (Australia, Brazil)	3M; LRC Products Ltd (in Australia, for condoms)	Used in Brazil ("fita durex") and some areas of Australia as a generic name for adhesive tape.
Edding	Marker pen	Edding AG	Often used in Germany for marker pens.
Elastoplast	Adhesive bandage	Beiersdorf	Much like "Band-Aid" in North America, the name has become a genericized trademark in some Commonwealth countries including the United Kingdom and Australia.
EpiPen	Epinephrine autoinjector	Viatris (formerly Mylan)	Commonly used in the United States and Canada as a catch-all term for epinephrine autoinjectors.
Esky	Cooler	Coleman, part of Newell Brands	Australian usage
Filofax	Personal organizer	FLB Group Ltd, formerly Letts Filofax Group	
Fix-A-Flat	Canned tire inflator	Illinois Tool Works	
Formica	Wood or plastic laminate	Formica Corporation, part of Broadview Holdings	Widely used for the generic product. An attempt to have the trademark quashed failed in 1977.
Freon	Refrigerant	DuPont (formerly), Chemours	Frequently used to refer to any type of refrigerant, though Freon is specifically Dichlorodifluoromethane, or R-12.
Frisbee	Flying disc	Wham-O	Frequently used to describe the flying disc toy, as well as sports such as Ultimate Frisbee (Ultimate) and Frisbee Golf (Disc Golf).
Gib board	Drywall	Winstone Wallboards	Widely used term within New Zealand to refer to plasterboard, after the name of the country's market-leading product of its type (still trademarked).
Gillette	Safety razor	Procter & Gamble	Used in Portugal, Brazil and Turkey as a generic for any safety or cartridge razor. In Indonesian, it has evolved into silet, and became the standard term for any razor.
Glad Wrap	Cling-film	Glad (company)	Used in Australia, New Zealand.
Glock	Semi-automatic pistol	Glock (company)	Commonly used in the United States as a synonym for a semi-automatic pistol, especially within hiphop music.
Google	Internet search engine	Google LLC	See Google (verb)
Hacky Sack	Footbag	Wham-O	
Hardie Board, HardiePlank	Fibre cement products, for cement board and fiber cement siding specifically	James Hardie	
Hills Hoist	Rotary clothes line	Hills Industries	Australian usage
Hoover	Vacuum cleaner	Hoover Company	Widely used as a noun and verb. De facto loss of trademark in the UK.
Hula hoop	Toy hoop	Wham-O	
Indomie	Instant noodle	Indofood	Common in Indonesia and Nigeria as a genericized mark for any instant noodle.
InFocus	Video projector	InFocus Corporation	Common in Indonesia as a genericized mark for any projector intended to be connected to a computer.
Jacuzzi	Hot tub or whirlpool bath	Jacuzzi	
Jandals	Flip-flops	ACTSTA	The ordinary term for flip-flops in New Zealand but the trademark is still registered and occasionally enforced.
Javex	Bleach	Clorox Company	Used primarily in Canada, where bleach is "eau de javel" as a French-language generic. Acquired from Colgate-Palmolive in late 2006.
JCB	Backhoe loader	J. C. Bamford	Has become a generic term for an excavator mounted with both a front loader and a backhoe in British English, as recognized by the Oxford English Dictionary. Invented by J C Bamford Excavators Ltd., which is still the largest supplier of backhoe loaders.
Jeep	Compact sport utility vehicle	Chrysler, part of Stellantis	Chrysler recently used "trademark awareness" advertisements to prevent the brand from becoming a generic noun or verb, including such statements as They invented 'SUV' because they can't call them Jeep In Ireland all SUVs are colloquially called jeeps, whereas in the UK they are 'four-wheel drives'.
Jell-O	Gelatin dessert, jelly	Kraft Heinz	The name is commonly used in the US to refer to any gelatin-like dessert.
Jetway	Passenger boarding bridge	JBT AeroTech	The name commonly used to describe any brand of enclosed, movable connector which most commonly extends from an airport terminal gate to an airplane, and in some instances from a port to a boat or ship, allowing passengers to board and disembark without going outside or being exposed to the elements.
Jet Ski	Stand-up personal watercraft	Kawasaki	Used universally to refer to any type of personal watercraft. This news article is one example of usage.
Jiffy bag	padded mailing envelopes	Sealed Air	
JumboTron	Large-screen television	Sony	Still used, although Sony exited the market for this product in 2001.
Kärcher	pressure washer	Kärcher	The name is colloquially used synonymously with a pressure washer in some countries such as Germany, France, Poland, Russia, Georgia, Mexico, Spain and the United States.
Kleenex	Facial tissue	Kimberly-Clark	Often used by consumers as if it were generic in the U.S., France and Canada, but still a legally recognized trademark.
Kool-Aid	Drink mix	Kraft Heinz	Often used in the phrase "Drinking the Kool-Aid," referring to the adoption of a dangerous idea because of peer pressure.
Koozie	Can cooler	Scribe OpCo, Inc. (dba The Koozie Group)	"Koozie" is commonly used as a generic term for all foam or neoprene insulators that cover a container, usually a can or a bottle, in order to keep the beverage cold.
Kraft Dinner	Macaroni & cheese	Kraft Heinz	Often used by consumers in Canada, but still a legally recognized trademark.
Labello	lip balm stick	Beiersdorf	Often used synonymously for a lip balm stick in Germany and Austria.
Lava lamp	Liquid motion lamp	Mathmos	
Learjet	Business jet	Bombardier Aerospace	Has been used to describe any business jet regardless of builder, due to Bill Lear's skill in public relations. Production of Learjet-branded aircraft ended in 2021 due to steadily declining sales versus larger and more comfortable competitors.
Lego	Interlocking bricks	The Lego Group	"Lego" is commonly used as a mass noun ("some Lego") or, in American English, as a countable noun with plural "Legos", to refer to the bricks themselves.
Lexan	Polycarbonate resin thermoplastic glass	SABIC	
Liquid Paper	Correction fluid	Newell Brands	A white liquid applied with a brush used to hide mistakes, written or typed, with ink so they can be overwritten. (Australia, see also Wite-Out in the US Tipp-Ex in the UK and Ireland)
LISTSERV	Electronic mailing list	L-Soft International	Email discussion list software developed in 1986 as a revised version of Bitnic Listserv (1984).
Lysol	Cresol soap solution	Reckitt	Although most modern Lysol product use benzalkonium chloride instead, the word "Lysol" remains used for cresol soap solution in some professional settings.
Mace	Pepper spray	Mace Security International	
Maclean	Toothpaste	Haleon	Common in Nigeria as a genericized term for toothpaste.
Maggi	Bouillon cube, Instant noodle	Nestlé	A widely recognized genericized term for Bouillon cube and other food seasoning in Nigeria. It is synonymous with instant noodle in Malaysia and South Asia.
Matchbox	Die cast toy	Mattel	Used at its height of popularity to describe die cast cars.
Memory Stick	Flash memory storage device	Sony	Typically used to refer to USB flash drives, as opposed to other brands of memory cards akin to Sony's products.
Miojo	instant noodles	Myojo Foods (as of 2007, subsidiary of Nissin foods)	Commonly used in Brazil to describe any instant noodles, first commercialized in said country by Myojo Foods in 1965.
Muzak	Elevator music, background music	Muzak Holdings	An often derogatory term frequently used to describe any form of Easy Listening, smooth jazz, or Middle of the road music, or to the type of recordings once commonly heard on "beautiful music" radio stations.
NOS (Nitrous Oxide Systems)	Nitrous	Holley Performance Products	Widely used generically to describe nitrous systems used in motor vehicles. One example of this was when it was used prominently in the 2001 film The Fast and the Furious
Nestlé	Chocolate bar	Nestlé	Commonly used term for chocolate bars in Iraq, pronounced [nastala]
Odol	Toothpaste	Haleon	Commonly used term for toothpaste in Indonesia.
Onesies	Infant/Adult bodysuit (babygro)	Gerber Childrenswear	Often used by consumers in the U.S. as if it were generic; "Onesies" is still a legally trademarked brand name of Gerber Childrenswear, which objects to its usage in the singular form as "Onesie" or as a generic product name. Recently used to describe an adult bodysuit.
Ozempic	GLP-1 agonists	Novo	
Pampers	Diapers	Procter & Gamble	Pampers are frequently used as a synonym for diapers in Russia and other CIS countries irrespective of actual brand.
Photoshop	Photo manipulation	Adobe Inc.	Commonly used as a verb to generically describe digital manipulation or compositing of photographs. See Photoshop (verb).
Ping Pong	Table tennis	Parker Brothers	Originally trademarked by Jaques and Son, was later passed to Parker Bros. A number of U.S. organizations nowadays are required to refer its sport as table tennis as means of trademark protection.
Plasticine	Modelling clay	Flair Leisure Products plc	Often applied as a name for a putty-like modelling material made from calcium salts, petroleum jelly and aliphatic acids. It is often used as modelling medium for art such as claymation.
Play-Doh	Modelling clay	Hasbro	In 2011, the United Kingdom High Court determined "Play Dough" to be trademarked by Hasbro after a German toy maker labelled its Yummy Dough edible modelling clay with the strapline "THE EDIBLE PLAY DOUGH!".
Plexiglas, Plexiglass	Acrylic glass	Altuglas International, Rohm & Haas (formerly)	Often misspelled with a double "s", which appears to have become generic, possibly providing partial protection for the tradename "Plexiglas"
Pogo	Corn dog	Conagra Brands	The generic, but still trademarked, term for corn dogs in Canada, derived from the popular brand.
Polaroid	Instant cameras and instant film	Polaroid B.V., formerly Polaroid Corporation	Though Polaroid Corporation mostly held a monopoly on instant photography during its existence, the term is also used to refer to competitors such as Instax from Fujifilm. It is also used by photographers to refer to polarizing filters.
Popsicle	Ice pop; ice lolly (UK); icy pole (Australia)	Good Humor-Breyers, part of Unilever	
Portakabin	Portable building	Portakabin Ltd., owned by Shepherd Building Group	Widely used term for a portable modular building in the UK. Portakabin is among the brands poked fun at by the satirical magazine Private Eye over its attempts to protect the term against genericization.
Positraction	Limited-slip differential	General Motors	Marketing term for clutch-type limited-slip differentials on vehicles sold by General Motors' Chevrolet division; now commonly used to refer to any limited-slip differential, regardless of automaker or type.
Post-it	Sticky note	3M	Often used by consumers as if it were generic in the UK, U.S. and Canada, but still a legally recognized trademark.
PostShop	post office	NZ Post	Widely use to refer to post offices in New Zealand, although the CamelCase form is the only one on the registered trademark.
Pot Noodle	Instant noodles	Unilever	Used widely in the United Kingdom as it is the dominant brand.
PowerPoint	Slide show presentation program	Microsoft	
Pritt Stick	Glue stick	Henkel	A newspaper article by the Daily Mirror (on 27 March 2010) treated the brand as a generic name, another example of use is by The Guardian on its 16 June 2007 article.
Pull-Ups	disposable training pants	Kimberly-Clark	
Putt-Putt golf	Miniature golf	Putt-Putt Fun Center	
Pyrex	Borosilicate glass	Corelle Brands	
Q-tips	Cotton swabs; cotton buds (UK and Ireland); cotton tip (Australia)	Unilever	Often used by consumers as if it were generic in the U.S. and Canada, but still a legally recognized trademark.
Razor scooter	compact folding scooter	Micro Mobility Systems	
Realtor	Real estate agent	National Association of Realtors, Canadian Real Estate Association	Often used in the U.S. and Canada to refer to any real estate agent, but the term is a legally recognized trademark of the National Association of Realtors and the Canadian Real Estate Association that refers exclusively to their members in each respective country. The associations have engaged in publicity efforts to educate the public regarding the term's proper use.
Rizla	Rolling paper	Imperial Tobacco	Often used to describe rolling papers which are used to contain rolled tobacco or cannabis.
Rollerblade	Inline skates	Nordica, owned by Tecnica Group	Commonly used name by consumers in the U.S. and Canada, but the name is still a trademark.
Romex	Non-metallic sheathed cable, Thermoplastic-sheathed cable	Southwire (company).	Commonly used name by consumers in the U.S., but the name is still a trademark.
Roomba	Robotic vacuum cleaner	iRobot Corporation	Commonly used to refer to robotic vacuum cleaners, regardless of brand.
Rugby	Rubber cement	Bostik Philippines, Inc.	Being the first rubber cement brand in the Philippines, eventually used to refer to any brand of rubber contact cement. See also Rugby boy, a collective term for destitute youths known for their use of rubber cement as an inhalant.
Saran wrap	Cling-film	S. C. Johnson & Son	Commonly used in the United States as a synonym for clingfilm or plastic wrap.
Sawzall	Reciprocating saw	Milwaukee Electric Tool Corporation	Commonly used to refer to a reciprocating saw, regardless of brand.
Scalextric	Slot car	Hornby Railways	Used commonly in the United Kingdom to describe slot cars and the hobbies itself.
Scotch tape	Clear adhesive tape (US)	3M	Appears in dictionaries as both generic and trademarked. "Trademark Law" advises that proper usage is "Scotch brand cellophane tape" to combat "generic tendencies".
Ski-Doo	Snowmobile	Bombardier Recreational Products	Usage in Canada, especially Quebec and British Columbia.
Sea-Doo	Sit-down personal watercraft	Bombardier Recreational Products	Used regionally in the U.S. (where the company holds 50.3% of the market share) to refer to any type of sit-down PWC. Usage is strongest in Canada, especially in Quebec, where the manufacturer is based.
Sellotape	Clear adhesive tape (UK and Ireland)	Sellotape Company, owned by Henkel Consumer Adhesives	Often used generically as a verb and noun. Appears in dictionaries as both generic and trademarked.
Sharpie	Permanent marker	Sanford L.P., owned by Newell Brands	James Faulkner, Sanford's marketing manager, has said "In America the Sharpie name is used as the generic for a permanent marker".
Skilsaw	Circular saw	NANJING CHERVON INDUSTRY CO.	Commonly used instead of saying circular saw.
Softail	Motorcycle suspension	Harley-Davidson	Registered trademark for a line of Harley-Davidson motorcycles with a suspension that mimics the appearance of a rigid frame, and has since been used to refer to motorcycles of other makes with hidden rear suspensions as well as bicycles incorporating a rear suspension.
Speedo	Swim briefs	Speedo	
Stetson	Cowboy hat	John B. Stetson Company	Although John B. Stetson Company manufactures other types of brimmed hats, the word Stetson has been long used for a generic cowboy hat which features a high crown and wide brim.
Stanley knife	Utility knife	Stanley Works	In Great Britain, the press and law enforcement officers have referred to it as Stanley knife during incidents, regardless if said weapon is actually a utility knife. The trademark has since become a dictionary term.
Stelvin closure	Screw cap	Rio Tinto Alcan	Often used generically.
Styrofoam	Polystyrene foam	Dow Chemical Company (formerly), DuPont	In the United States and Canada, "styrofoam" is often used as a generic term for disposable foam cups, plates, coolers and packing material, although these are made from a different polystyrene product than true Styrofoam Brand Foam, which is made for thermal insulation and craft applications. In Poland, 'Styropian' (where '-foam' was directly translated into Polish '-pian(a)') is commonly used as a generic term for all types of polystyrene foam, even in commercial settings (as recorded in the Polish language corpus).
Tannoy	Public-address (PA) system	Tannoy Ltd.	UK usage
Targa top	Semi-convertible hard roof panel	Porsche	Although first used in the 1960s, trademark was not claimed until the 1970s, when its popularity grew; hence, the name is treated as a generic trademark by the general public and the motoring press to describe a detachable hard roof panel for cars.
Tarmac	Asphalt road surface	Tarmac (part of CRH plc)	Often used by consumers as if it were generic in the UK and Canada, but still a legally recognized trademark.
Taser	Electroshock weapon, stun gun	Taser Systems, Axon Enterprise	Originally TASER, an acronym for a fictional weapon: Thomas A. Swift's Electric Rifle. Taser is a registered tradename, prompting a backformed verb "to tase" which means "to use a Taser on", although "to taser" is also commonly used.
Tayto	Crisps (Ireland)	Intersnack	Very common in Ireland to refer to all crisps and potato or corn based snacks as Taytos
Tempo	Facial tissue	Essity	In Germany paper handkerchiefs of other brands are often referred to as "Tempo handkerchief" or "Tempo" for short.
Tesafilm	Clear adhesive tape	Tesa SE	Very common in Germany to adhesive tapes.
Transformer	Mecha	Hasbro/Tomy	Became used largely due to the success of the film franchise, regardless of its need for human pilots or lack of transforming capabilities, most commonly a Gundam. Example: During the 2020 Summer Olympics, the BBC was called out on Twitter by the anime press and its fanbase for mistaking a monument of RX-0 Unicorn Gundam (from Mobile Suit Gundam Unicorn), installed outside Odaiba's DiverCity Tokyo Plaza for a Transformer.
Tipp-Ex	Correction fluid	Tipp-Ex GmbH & Co. KG	Common throughout Europe
Tivoli	Amusement park	Tivoli A/S	The Danish Tivoli Gardens amusement park has registered its colloquial name "Tivoli" as company name and trademark. In Danish language, the word "tivoli" has however been a generic term for "amusement park" from before the Tivoli Gardens opened in 1843 and is still used as such, for instance in the name of many other amusement parks all over Denmark and other Scandinavian countries. This is currently the focal point of several legal disagreements, with the first (Tivoli A/S vs Innocent Pictures ApS) leading to a win for Tivoli A/S in Denmark's Supreme Court in September 2010.
Three-peat	three consecutive wins	Riles & Co. (Pat Riley)	Trademark applies to usage on merchandises.
Tupperware	Plastic storage containers	Earl Tupper	Preparation, storage, containment, and serving products for the kitchen and home, which were first introduced to the public in 1946.
Uber	Ridesharing company	Uber	Frequently used as a verb.
UHU	Glue and adhesives	UHU	Often used for adhesives in Germany.
Vaseline	Petroleum jelly, petrolatum	Unilever	Often used by consumers as if it were generic, but still a legally recognized trademark.
Velcro	Hook-and-loop fastener	Velcro Companies	Used as generic, but still trademarked. Often used as a verb.
Vetsin	Monosodium glutamate	Tien Chun Ve-Tsin	Philippine term for monosodium glutamate, from the formerly most popular brand. Ajinomoto leads the monosodium glutamate market presently, but people still refer to it as Vetsin/Bitsin. In China, the term "Vetsin" (味精, Weijing) has never been a trade mark.
Walkman	Personal stereo	Sony	Was often used generically for any portable stereo player (usually cassette players), and in 2002 an Austrian court ruled that it had passed into common usage, but still a legally recognized trademark.
WaveRunner	Personal water craft	Yamaha Motor Company	Often used, along with Jet Ski, to refer to any type of personal watercraft.
Winnebago	Recreational vehicle	Winnebago Industries	Used in the United Kingdom to describe a coach sized American motorhome. The term is also used generically in the United States to describe pretty much any motorhome, but not to the same extent.
Wite-Out	Correction fluid	Société Bic	A white liquid applied with a brush used to hide mistakes, written or typed, with ink so they can be overwritten. (US, see also Tipp-Ex in the UK and Ireland)
Xerox	Photocopier or to make a photocopy	Xerox	Xerox has used "trademark awareness" advertisements to prevent the brand from becoming a generic noun or verb, including such statements as "You can't make a Xerox." However, it is used in the Philippines, India, Russia, Poland and Brazil as a generic word for 'photocopy'.
Zamboni	Ice resurfacer	Zamboni Company	Frank J. Zamboni & Co., Inc. has taken a strong stance against its trademark dilution, the Zamboni name being used as a genericized trademark for ice resurfacers; the company holds a registered trademark on the design and configuration of the Zamboni Ice Resurfacer by the U.S. Patent and Trademark Office.
Zeppelin	Rigid airship	Luftschiffbau Zeppelin	
Zimmer frame	Walking frame	Zimmer Holdings	
Ziploc	Zipper storage bag	SC Johnson	
Zodiac	Inflatable boat	Zodiac Milpro	
Zoom	Videoconferencing	Zoom Video Communications	Frequently used as a verb.
