= New Zealand English =

Variant of English language

- Native to: New Zealand
- Native speakers: 3.8 million in New Zealand (2013 census); 150,000 L2 speakers of English in New Zealand (Crystal 2003)
- Language family: Indo-European: Germanic; West Germanic; Ingvaeonic; Anglo-Frisian; Anglic; English; New Zealand English
- Early forms: Old English: Middle English; Early Modern English; Modern English; 19th century British English; early 20th century British English
- Dialects: Southern burr (Southland/Otago); Taranaki
- Writing system: Latin (English alphabet); Unified English Braille

Language codes
- ISO 639-3: –
- Glottolog: newz1240
- IETF: en-NZ

New Zealand English (NZE) is the variant of the English language spoken and written by most New Zealanders. Its language code in ISO and Internet standards is en-NZ. English is the first language of the majority of the population.

The English language was brought to New Zealand by colonists during the 19th century. It is one of "the newest native-speaker variet[ies] of the English language in existence, a variety which has developed and become distinctive only in the last 150 years". The variety of English that had the biggest influence on the development of New Zealand English was Australian English, itself derived from Southeastern England English, with considerable influence from Scottish and Hiberno-English, and with lesser influences the British prestige accent Received Pronunciation (RP) and American English. An important source of vocabulary is the Māori language of the indigenous people of New Zealand, whose contribution distinguishes New Zealand English from other varieties.

Non-rhotic New Zealand English is most similar to Australian English in pronunciation, but has key differences. A prominent difference is the realisation of /ɪ/ (the KIT vowel): in New Zealand English this is pronounced as a schwa. New Zealand English has several increasingly distinct varieties, and while most New Zealanders speak non-rhotic English, rhoticity is increasing quickly, especially among Pasifika and Māori in Auckland and the upper North Island.

== Dictionaries ==
The first dictionary with entries documenting New Zealand English was probably the Heinemann New Zealand Dictionary published in 1979. Edited by Harry Orsman (1928–2002), it is a 1,337-page book with information relating to the usage and pronunciation of terms that were widely accepted throughout the English-speaking world, and those peculiar to New Zealand. It includes a one-page list of the approximate date of entry into common parlance of the many terms found in New Zealand English but not elsewhere, such as "haka" (1827), "boohai" (1920), and "bach" (1905). A second edition was published in 1989 with the cover subtitle "The first dictionary of New Zealand English and New Zealand pronunciation". A third edition, edited by Nelson Wattie, was published as The Reed Dictionary of New Zealand English by Reed Publishing in 2001.

The first dictionary fully dedicated to the New Zealand variety of English was The New Zealand Dictionary published by New House Publishers in 1994 and edited by Elizabeth and Harry Orsman. A second edition was published in 1995.

In 1997, Oxford University Press produced the Harry Orsman-edited The Dictionary of New Zealand English: A Dictionary of New Zealandisms on Historical Principles, a 981-page book, which it claimed was based on over 40 years of research. This research started with Orsman's 1951 thesis and continued with his editing this dictionary. To assist with and maintain this work, the New Zealand Dictionary Centre was founded in 1997 by Victoria University of Wellington and Oxford University Press. This was followed by The New Zealand Oxford Paperback Dictionary in 1998, edited by New Zealand lexicographer Tony Deverson. It is based on The Oxford Paperback Dictionary, fourth edition, and The Australian Oxford Paperback Dictionary, second edition.

Further lexicographical work culminated in the 1,355-page The New Zealand Oxford Dictionary published in 2005, by Tony Deverson and Graeme Kennedy. The dictionary contains over 100,000 definitions, including 10,000 New Zealand entries and over 10,000 encyclopedic entries. A second, revised edition of The New Zealand Oxford Paperback Dictionary was published in 2006, this time using standard lexicographical regional markers to identify the New Zealand content, which were absent from the first edition. The NZ Dictionary Centre ceased active operations after the retirement of its second Director, Dianne Bardsley, in 2012.

Another source of well-cited New Zealand words and phrases is the Collins English Dictionary, first published in 1979 by HarperCollins. Though this dictionary primarily draws from the Bank of English, a corpus of English literature maintained by the University of Birmingham with HarperCollins' support since 1980, a New Zealand editor informs the content of each edition. The role was filled by Professor Ian Gordon of Victoria University, and then by Professor Elizabeth Gordon (no relation) of the University of Canterbury.

Australia's Macquarie Dictionary was first published in 1981, and has since become the authority on Australian English. It has always included an abundance of New Zealand words and phrases additional to the mutually shared words and phrases of both countries. Every edition has retained a New Zealand resident advisor for the New Zealand content, the first being Harry Orsman. and the most recent being Victoria University of Wellington lexicographer Laurie Bauer.

== Historical development ==
From the 1790s, New Zealand was visited by British, French and American whaling, sealing and trading ships. Their crews traded European and American goods with the indigenous Māori. The first European settlers were sailors and traders, and also some escaped convicts from Australia. Most of the earliest European settlers intermarried with and lived among Māori in harmony. They were greatly outnumbered by Māori and relied on them for security and safety. The first missionaries to Māori arrived from England in 1814, bringing formal education and farming skills in addition to Christianity.

When the New Zealand Company announced in 1839 its plans to establish formal colonies in New Zealand, this and the increased commercial interests of merchants in Sydney and London spurred the British to take stronger action to establish British sovereignty over New Zealand. Captain William Hobson was sent to New Zealand to persuade Māori to cede their sovereignty to the British Crown and on 6 February 1840 Hobson and about forty Māori chiefs (rangatira) signed the Treaty of Waitangi at Waitangi in the Bay of Islands.

New Zealand became the Colony of New Zealand on 1 July 1841. From this point, there was considerable European settlement, primarily from England, Scotland, Wales and Ireland, but also from the United States, South Africa, and parts of continental Europe. Some 400,000 settlers came from Britain, of whom 300,000 stayed permanently. Most were young people and 250,000 babies were born.

After the Treaty of Waitangi, the next few years saw tensions grow over disputed land purchases by settlers as well as some communities refusing to accept British rule. Conflicts escalated into what became the New Zealand Wars from 1845 to 1872. The colonial government summoned thousands of British troops from Britain and Australia, as well as locally recruited pro-British militia forces, to mount major campaigns to overpower the Māori and Māori-allied separatist movements, eventually resulting in the defeat of the rebel forces.

Despite the wars, gold discoveries in Otago (1861) and Westland (1865) caused a worldwide gold rush that more than doubled the New Zealand population from 71,000 in 1859 to 164,000 in 1863. In 1864–65, under the New Zealand Settlements Act 1863, thirteen ships carrying citizens of England, Scotland, Ireland and South Africa arrived in New Zealand under the Waikato Immigration Scheme. According to census data from 1871, around half of the early settlers were English, one-quarter Scots, one-quarter Irish and 5% Australian.

The European population of New Zealand grew explosively from fewer than 1,000 in 1831 to 500,000 by 1881. By 1911, the population of New Zealand had reached one million, of which 49,844 were Māori. 702,779 were New Zealand-born. The largest foreign-born demographics were those born in England and Scotland, followed by Australia and Ireland.

A distinct New Zealand variant of the English language has been recognised since at least 1912, when Frank Arthur Swinnerton described it as a "carefully modulated murmur". From the beginning of the haphazard Australian and European settlements and latter official British migrations, a new dialect began to form by adopting Māori words to describe the different flora and fauna of New Zealand, for which English did not have words.

The New Zealand accent first appeared in towns with mixed populations of immigrants from Australia, England, Ireland, and Scotland. These included the militia towns of the North Island and the gold-mining towns of the South Island. In more homogeneous towns such as those in Otago and Southland, settled mainly by people from Scotland, the New Zealand accent took longer to appear, while the accent was quick to develop in schools starting from the 1890s.

Since the late 20th century, New Zealand society has gradually absorbed influences from all over the world, especially in the early 21st century when non-British immigration increased, leading to a more multicultural society. The Internet, television, films and popular music have all brought international influences into New Zealand society and the New Zealand lexicon. Americanisation of New Zealand society and language has subtly and gradually been taking place since World War II and more significantly from the 1970s.

As of 2026, English is a statutory official language of New Zealand alongside the Māori language and New Zealand Sign Language. For a long time, English was a de facto official language, which may have been used in any public or official context. In 2018, MP Clayton Mitchell of New Zealand First put forward a bill for English to be recognised as an official language in legislation. During the 2023 New Zealand general election, New Zealand First leader Winston Peters promised to make English an official language of New Zealand, and in 2026 the English Language Act 2026 was introduced to put this into effect. This bill passed into law on 30 July 2026.

== Phonology ==
Variation in New Zealand vowels
Lexical set	Phoneme	Phonetic realisation	
Lexical set	Phoneme	Cultivated	Broad
DRESS	/e/	[e̞]	[ɪ]
TRAP	/ɛ/	[æ]	[ɛ̝]
KIT	/ə/	[ɪ̠]	[ə]
NEAR	/iə/	[i̞ə], [e̝ə]	[i̞ə]
SQUARE	/eə/	[e̞ə]	[i̞ə]
FACE	/æɪ/	[æɪ]	[ɐɪ]
PRICE	/ɑɪ/	[ɑ̟ɪ]	[ɒ̝ˑɪ], [ɔɪ]
GOAT	/ɐʉ/	[ɵʊ]	[ɐʉ]
MOUTH	/æʊ/	[aʊ]	[e̞ə]

Not all New Zealanders have the same accent, as the level of cultivation (i.e. the closeness to Received Pronunciation) of every speaker's accent differs. An identifiable feature of New Zealand English is its chain shift where the TRAP vowel has moved up to the place of the traditional DRESS vowel, which in turn has moved up towards the traditional KIT vowel, which in turn is centralised. This makes "bat" sound like "bet", "bet" sound like "bit", and "bit" sound like "but" to foreign ears. For example "six" is [səks] in New Zealand English but [sɪks] in Australian English. General New Zealand English is non-rhotic, however Southland/Otago is semi-rhotic due to the accent's Scottish influence.

== Vocabulary ==
New Zealand English has a number of dialectal words and phrases. These are mostly informal terms that are more common in casual speech. Numerous loanwords have been taken from the Māori language or from Australian English.

New Zealand adopted decimal currency in 1967 and the metric system in 1974. Despite this, several imperial measures are still widely encountered and usually understood, such as feet and inches for a person's height, pounds and ounces for an infant's birth weight, and in colloquial terms such as referring to drinks in pints. In the food manufacturing industry in New Zealand both metric and non-metric systems of weight are used and usually understood, owing to raw food products being imported from both metric and non-metric countries. However, per the December 1976 Weights and Measures Amendment Act, all foodstuffs must be retailed using the metric system. In general, the knowledge of non-metric units is lessening.

Both the words amongst and among are used, as are two other pairs, whilst and while and amidst and amid.

=== Australian English influences ===
New Zealand English terms of Australian origin include bushed (lost or bewildered), chunder (to vomit), cooker (a derogatory term for conspiracy theorists), drongo (a foolish or stupid person), fossick (to search), larrikin (mischievous person), Maccas (slang for McDonald's), maimai (a duckshooter's hide; originally a makeshift shelter, from aboriginal mia-mia), paddock (for field, or meadow), pom or pommy (an Englishman), skite (verb: to boast), station (for a very large farm), wowser (non-drinker of alcohol, or killjoy), and ute (pickup truck).

=== American English influences ===
Although it has British and Australian English origins, New Zealand English has also evolved to include many terms of American origin, or which are otherwise used in American English, in preference to, or alongside the equivalent contemporary British terms. Many American borrowings are not unique to New Zealand English, and may be found in other varieties of English, including British English. Some examples of such words in New Zealand English are the preferred usage of the American bobby pin over the British hair pin, muffler for silencer, truck for lorry, station wagon for estate car, stove for cooker, creek over brook or stream, eggplant for aubergine, median strip for central reservation, and pushup for press-up. New Zealanders, like Australians, use chip for both what British English would call a chip and a crisp, in case of ambiguity the British chip is called a hot chip.

Other examples of vocabulary directly borrowed from American English include the boonies, bucks (dollars), butt (bum or arse), ding (dent), dude, duplex, faggot or fag (interchangeable with the British poof and poofter), figure (to think or conclude; consider), hightail it, homeboy, hooker, lagoon, lube (oil change), man (in place of mate or bro in direct address), major (to study or qualify in a subject), to be over [some situation] (be fed up), rig (large truck), sheltered workshop (workplace for disabled persons), spat (a small argument), and subdivision, and tavern.

Regarding grammar, gotten can be used as opposed to the standard British got in New Zealand English in active contexts, though some speakers do not use it. It has been increasing in usage in recent years and is rarely written down.

=== New Zealandisms ===
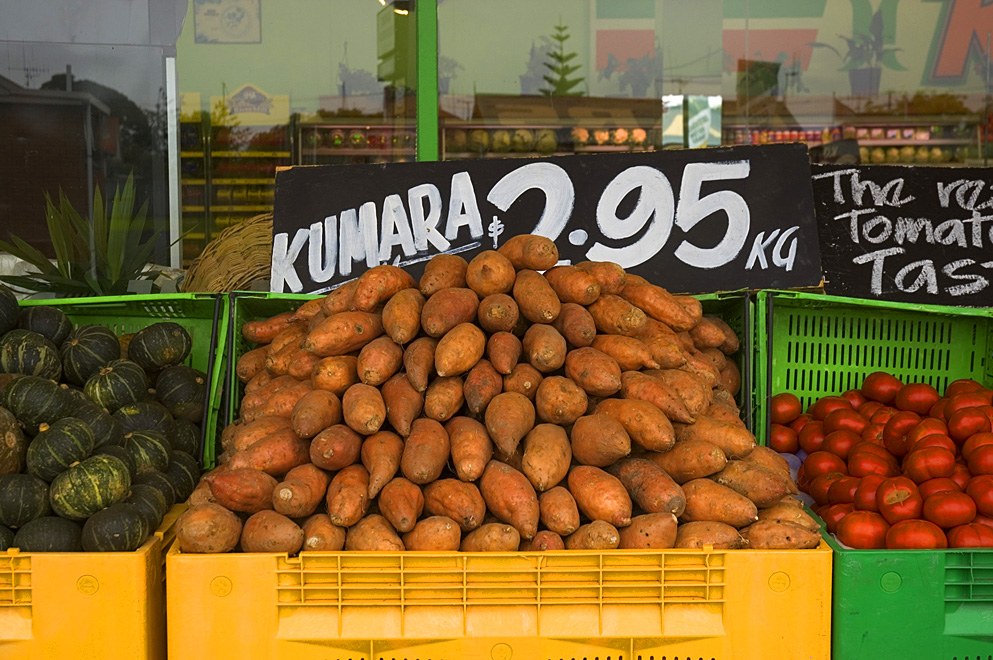
Kūmara (sweet potatoes) for sale in Thames, New Zealand

Some English words are used almost exclusively in New Zealand.

- bach (noun) – cheaply built and basic holiday home; located at beaches throughout the country
- Carbonettes (noun, especially in the North Island) – pieces of charcoal used in barbecues
- convert (verb) – to steal a car, hence also the name for car theft being car conversion
- chur (interj) — hello, cheers, thanks
- crib (noun) – similar to bach (above), used more in Otago and Southland
- dairy (noun) – corner shop; convenience store.
- durry (noun) – cigarette
- eh? (particle) – used to elicit a response. Used much more in New Zealand than in the stereotypical Canadian English.
- handle (noun) – a 425–500 mL glass of beer with a handle, as sold in pubs
- hardout/hard – used to show agreement, or used to show emphasis/intensity. Examples: Agreement: "Yeah hard/hardout". "He was running hardout."
- heaps (adjective, adverb) – abundant, plenty, plentifully. Examples: "There are heaps of cops surrounding the house." "I love you heaps." "Give it heaps!" – give it your best effort! often in cooking someone would say, "that's heaps" meaning 'that's too much' (also used in Australia)
- hokey pokey (noun) – the New Zealand term for honeycomb toffee; also a flavour of ice cream consisting of plain vanilla ice cream with small, solid lumps of honeycomb toffee.
- jandals (noun) – the NZ term for flip-flops. Originally a trademarked name derived from "Japanese sandals".
- jug (noun) – a kettle (also used in Australia)
- kai (noun) – Māori word meaning food, or something to eat, used by Māori and Pākehā alike
- kūmara (noun) – sweet potato, specifically those historically cultivated by Māori.
- munted (adj.) – broken; ruined; wrecked
- puckerood (adj) – broken; busted; wrecked. From Māori "pakaru" – to shatter
- sweet as! (interj) – cool; awesome
- tramping (noun) tramp (verb) – Bushwalking, hiking. Usage is exclusive to New Zealand.

=== Differences from Australian English ===
Many of these relate to words used to refer to common items, often based on which major brands become eponyms.

NZ	Australia	Translation to US/UK English
chilly bin	Esky (Note: a genericised trademark)	An insulated box used to keep food or drink cool, also known as a cooler
bach crib (Note: Crib is mainly used in the southern part of the South Island, bach in the rest of New Zealand.)	shack	a small, often very modest holiday property, often at the seaside
dairy (Note: In larger cities in New Zealand convenience store is used due to immigration (and to current NZ law forbidding a dairy from selling alcohol), though dairy is used commonly in conversation.)	milk bar deli	Convenience store, a small store selling mainly food
drinking fountain water fountain	bubbler (NSW) drinking fountain	Drinking fountain. (Bubbler is also used in some parts of the United States, like Rhode Island and Wisconsin)
duvet	Doona	Doona is an Australian trade mark for a brand of duvet/quilt.
ice block popsicle	ice block Icy Pole	Ice pop, ice lolly
jandals (Note: The word jandals was originally a trademarked name derived from "Japanese sandals".)	thongs	Flip-flops
thong, G-string	G-string	Thong
candy floss	fairy floss	Candy floss in the UK, cotton candy in the US
cattle stop	cattle grid	A device for preventing cattle wandering onto country roads
sallies	salvos	Followers of the Salvation Army church; also the second-hand shops run by the Salvation Army Church.
speed bump speed hump judder bar (Note: The term judder bar is regional in its usage in New Zealand, and is rarely encountered in some parts of the country.)	speed bump speed hump (Note: The latter is used in New South Wales and Victoria)	A raised section of road used to deter excessive speed
no exit	no through road	Signage for a road with a dead end, a cul-de-sac
Twink	Liquid Paper; Wite-Out	Correction fluid. Twink is a New Zealand brand name which has entered the vernacular as a generic term, being the first product of its kind introduced in the 1980s. The common Australian general term is white-out. Liquid Paper is also a brand name which is sometimes used as a generic term in Australia or New Zealand. As with other countries (but not Australia) the European brand Tipp-Ex is also available in New Zealand and is sometimes used as a generic term as well.
motorway	freeway, motorway	In Australia, controlled-access highways can be named as either freeway (a term not used in NZ; generally used in Victoria) or motorway (used in NZ, as well as New South Wales, Queensland, etc.), depending on the state. Tolled roads are common in some cities in Australia, and the term freeway is not used for roads that require a toll for use, the implication being that their use is not "free". "Highway" is common outside major cities in Australia.
"kia ora" "howdy" "g'day" "hello"	"g'day" "hello" (etc.)	Although the greeting "g'day" is as common in New Zealand as it is in Australia, the term "howdy" can be heard throughout New Zealand but not as frequently in Australia. This contraction of "how do you do?" is actually of English origin (South English dialect c. 1860), however is contemporarily associated with cowboys and Southern American English, particularly Texan English where it is a common greeting. It is possible the NZ origin is from the earlier British usage. In present day, "howdy" is not commonly used, with "how are you?" being more ubiquitous. When a rising intonation is used the phrase may be interpreted as an enquiry, but when slurred quickly and/or with a descending intonation, may be used as a casual greeting.
togs	bathers, swimmers, togs	A bathing suit. In NZ, "togs" is used throughout the country. In Australia however, it is one of the most well-known examples of regional variation in Australian English. The term for a bathing suit is "bathers" in the southern states as well as Western Australia and the Northern Territory, "swimmers" in New South Wales and the Australian Capital Territory and "togs" in Queensland.
vivid	texta	A marker pen; permanent marker. These are common brand names in their respective countries and they have become generic terms.
tramping hiking	bushwalking (or less commonly) hiking	Travel through open or (more often) forested areas on foot

== Usage ==
Some New Zealanders often reply to a question with a statement spoken with a rising intonation at the end. This often has the effect of making their statement sound like another question. There is enough awareness of this that it is seen in exaggerated form in comedy parody of New Zealanders, such as in the 1970s comedy character Lyn Of Tawa. This rising intonation can also be heard at the end of statements that are not in response to a question but to which the speaker wishes to add emphasis. High rising terminals are also heard in Australia.

In informal speech, some New Zealanders use the third person feminine she in place of the third person neuter it as the subject of a sentence, especially when the subject is the first word of the sentence. The most common use of this is in the phrase "She'll be right" meaning either "It will be okay" or "It is close enough to what is required". Similar to Australian English are uses such as "she was great car" or "she's a real beauty, this [object]".

Another specific New Zealand usage is the way in which New Zealanders refer to the country's two main islands. They are always (except on maps) referred to as "the North Island" and "the South Island". And because of their size, New Zealanders tend to think of these two islands as being 'places', rather than 'pieces of land', so the preposition "in" (rather than "on") is usually used – for example, "my mother lives in the North Island", "Christchurch is in the South Island". This is true only for the two main islands; for smaller islands, the usual preposition "on" is used – for example, "on Stewart Island", or "on Waiheke Island".

As in some other varieties of English, "us" is sometimes used in place of "me". A common example is "give us a go", meaning "give me a go". About half the country pronounce the words "grown" and "known" with two syllables, as "growen" and "knowen". Similarly to other English varieties, when /l/ follows a vowel it is often vocalised, dropping the usual contact of the tongue and the sound becomes a vowel. An example of this is changing the words "feel" to "fee-u" or "railway" to "rai-u-way".

== Māori influence ==
New Zealand English has gained many loanwords from Māori; those most commonly used are proper nouns including place names, and words that refer to New Zealand plants and animals which frequently have no other English name. For example, the kiwi, the national bird, takes its name from te reo. Other words and phrases for which English alternatives do exist are also in common use; however, they are more likely to be used if they carry specific meanings with respect to Māori culture, such as kaumātua ("elder"), iwi ("tribe, nation"), or karakia ("prayer").

Kia ora (literally "be healthy") is a widely adopted greeting of Māori origin, with the intended meaning of "hello". It can also mean "thank you", or signify agreement with a speaker at a meeting. The Māori greetings tēnā koe (to one person), tēnā kōrua (to two people) or tēnā koutou (to three or more people) are also widely used, as are farewells such as haere rā. The Māori phrase kia kaha ("be strong") is frequently encountered as an indication of moral support for someone starting a stressful undertaking or otherwise in a difficult situation. Many other words such as whānau ("family") and kai ("food") are also widely understood and used by New Zealanders. The Māori phrase Ka kite anō ("until I see you again") is quite commonly used.

The dominant influence of Māori on New Zealand English is lexical. A 1999 estimate based on the Wellington corpora of written and spoken New Zealand English put the proportion of words of Māori origin at approximately 0.6%, mostly place and personal names.

Māori speakers of NZE use Māori loanwords more often than non-Māori speakers, and Māori women more often than Māori men; no gender effect is observed among non-Māori NZE speakers. Māori NZE speakers use Māori loanwords more often when their audience is exclusively Māori than when they have non-Māori listeners.

Often the choice to use these words reflects an expression of social or political identity on the part of the speaker – as may also a choice not to use a Māori word when one exists. Although the use of Māori words in English correlates to some degree with the speaker's support for te reo, some supporters who are not Māori choose not to use Māori words out of concern that such words do not "belong" to them. Younger NZE speakers are more likely than older speakers to use Māori words denoting non-material aspects of culture, such as tapu ("sacred or cursed"), kōrero ("speech"), or kaitiakitanga ("stewardship").

Māori has a significant conceptual influence in legislature, government, and community agencies (e.g. health and education), where legislation requires that proceedings and documents be translated into Māori (under certain circumstances, and when requested). Political discussion and analysis of issues of sovereignty, environmental management, health, and social well-being thus rely on Māori at least in part. Māori as a spoken language is particularly important wherever community consultation occurs. Most of the 47 words or expressions from New Zealand English added to the Oxford English Dictionary in 2023 were of Māori etymology.

=== Pronunciation of Māori loanwords ===
The pronunciation of Māori loanwords (especially names) when speaking English, specifically the degree to which the words are assimilated to NZE phonology, is widely perceived in New Zealand as a social marker of the speaker's attitudes to the Māori language and people. One magazine columnist is quoted as saying

How a Pakeha chooses to pronounce "Māori" determines precisely where they fit on the PC scale. There are 11 possible variations, from "may-o-ree" at one end to Kim Hill's "mow-rri" at the other. The key is how broad you make your "a" and whether you roll your "r". Such small things, but they can make the difference between being taken for a Neanderthal bozo and getting on a polytech payroll.

In a 2018 interview, Māori actor-director Taika Waititi described New Zealand as "racist as fuck" primarily on the basis that "people just flat-out refuse to pronounce Māori names correctly". His comments aroused considerable backlash in the New Zealand media.

Among Māori people, the use of (non-assimilated) Māori pronunciations reflects the individual's degree of integration into the Māori community. Among non-Māori, supporters of te reo view Māori pronunciations as a marker of that support, but frequently do not use them out of concerns about getting them wrong or not being understood. Public service broadcaster Radio New Zealand's policy is to pronounce Māori words in English as they would be pronounced in Māori.

== Dialects and accents ==
Recognisable regional variations are slight, except for Southland and the southern part of neighbouring Otago, with its semi-rhotic "Southland burr", where the postvocalic R is pronounced rather than clipped. This southern area traditionally received heavy immigration from Scotland (see Dunedin). Several words and phrases common in Scots or Scottish English persist there; examples include the use of wee for "small", and phrases such as to do the messages meaning "to go shopping". Another Southland/Otago feature which may also relate to early Scottish settlement is the use of a short /æ/ vowel in words which elsewhere use long /aː/, such as dance or castle, which is also common in Australian English. Another feature is the maintaining of the /ʍ/ ~ /w/ distinction (e.g. where which and witch are not homophones).

Recent research (2012) suggests that postvocalic /r/ is not restricted to Southland and Otago, but is found also in the central North Island where there may be a Pasifika influence, but also a possible influence from modern New Zealand hip‐hop music, which has been shown to have high levels of non‐prevocalic /r/ after the /ɛ/ vowel.

Taranaki has been said to have a minor regional accent, possibly due to the high number of immigrants from the south-west of England. However, this is becoming less pronounced.

Although regional variations are slight, there is a socially salient distinction between the "cultivated" New Zealand accent, which approaches British Received Pronunciation in some respects, and the "broad" New Zealand accent showcased by John Clarke as "Fred Dagg" and parodied by Ginette McDonald as "Lyn of Tawa". The former is associated with educated urban-dwelling professionals and the latter with rural and/or working-class people. In reality these speech patterns are the two ends of a continuum rather than discrete and separate entities.

Some Māori have an accent distinct from the general New Zealand accent; and also tend to include Māori words more frequently. Comedian Billy T. James and the bro'Town TV programme were notable for featuring exaggerated versions of this. Linguists recognise this as "Māori English", and describe it as strongly influenced by syllable-timed Māori speech patterns. Linguists count "Pākehā English" as the other main accent, and note that it is beginning to adopt similar rhythms, distinguishing it from other stress-timed English accents.

It is commonly held that New Zealand English is spoken very quickly. This idea is given support by a study comparing adult New Zealand English and American English speakers which observed faster speaking and articulation rates among the New Zealand English group overall. However, a similar study with American and New Zealand English-speaking children found the opposite, with the speaking and articulation rates of the New Zealand children being slower. The same study proposed that differences in the relative number of tense and lax vowels between the two speaker groups may have influenced the speaking and articulation rates.

== Spelling ==
- Where there is a difference between British and US spelling (such as cancelling/canceling and jewellery/jewelry), the British spelling of double-L is universally used. The British use of single-L is also universally used in words such as enrol.
- New Zealand English prefers the use of tyres, not tires, except for trademarks such as Cooper Tires.
- The Commonwealth spelling of kerb (at roadside) is used over US curb.
- New Zealand spelling of -re words such as centre, fibre, litre, and theatre has always followed the British spelling as opposed to the American center, fiber, liter, and theater.
- Nouns with the -ce suffix such as defence and licence are usually spelt with -ce as opposed to the American defense and license.
- With -our words like colour/color or favour/favor the spelling of -our is almost always used except arbor in Arbor day or unless it is a trademark, such as Colorsteel or The Color Run.
- It is usual to form past tenses and past participles of certain verbs with -t and not -ed. For example, learn becomes learnt, spoil becomes spoilt, burn becomes burnt, dream becomes dreamt /dɹemt/, and smell becomes smelt. These verb forms are pronounced with a final unvoiced /t/ sound, meaning spoilt is pronounced /spoɪlt/ not /spoɪld/. This contrasts with American English, where -ed is far more common and is pronounced /d/ (e.g. dwelled /dweld/ is an American form of dwelt /dwelt/). Learned, the adjective meaning "wise", is universally spelt thus and pronounced as two syllables (/ˈlɵːnəd/). The past tenses and past participles of earn and boil are earned and boiled respectively, though they may be pronounced ending with a /t/ sound.
- Words with the digraphs ae and oe in British English are usually spelt as such in New Zealand English (e.g. faeces not feces) rather than with just e as in American English. There are some exceptions where certain words are becoming more commonly spelt with e, such as encyclopedia rather than encyclopaedia.
- In hyperbolic statements, the spellings of ton and tons are commonly used (e.g. I have tons of friends and I feel tons better), despite the metric system with its tonne having been introduced in the 1970s.
- In words that may be spelt with either an -ise or an -ize suffix (such as organise/organize) it is acceptable to use either in New Zealand English but -ise has taken precedence over several decades. This contrasts with American and Canadian English, where -ize is generally preferred, and British English, where -ise is also generally preferred. In Australian English -ise is strictly used.
- New Zealand favours fiord over fjord, unlike most other English-speaking countries. The fiord spelling was the normal one in English until the early 1920s, and is preserved in many place names worldwide. In New Zealand it is used in Fiordland, a region in the south-west.
- When spelling words borrowed from Māori, New Zealand English sometimes does not include macrons (e.g. Maori instead of Māori). Macrons have become more widespread over time.
- Gram, the unit of mass, is commonly spelt as such and not gramme, which is somewhat found in British English. The same holds true for the word's derivates (e.g., kilogram is more common than kilogramme).
- Contractions (i.e. shortened words that retain the final letter of the full word) do not terminate with a full stop. Thus the abbreviation of Doctor is Dr and that of Mister is Mr, as opposed to Dr. and Mr. in American English. Initialisms and acronyms such as USA and NASA (or Nasa) also do not include full stops. This has been the practice in New Zealand since the late 1970s.

== See also ==
- Culture of New Zealand
- English in the Commonwealth of Nations
- Regional accents of English

== Bibliography ==
- Bartlett, Christopher (1992). "Regional variation in New Zealand English: The case of Southland". New Zealand English Newsletter. 6: 5–15.
- Bauer, Laurie; Warren, Paul; Bardsley, Dianne; Kennedy, Marianna; Major, George (2007). "New Zealand English". Journal of the International Phonetic Association. 37 (1): 97–102. doi:10.1017/S0025100306002830.
- Cryer, Max (2002). Curious Kiwi Words. Auckland: HarperCollins Publishers.
- Crystal, David (2003). The Cambridge Encyclopedia of the English Language (2nd ed.). Cambridge University Press.
- Deverson, Tony; Kennedy, Graeme, eds. (2005). The New Zealand Oxford Dictionary. Melbourne: Oxford University Press. ISBN 0-19-558451-1.
- Gordon, Elizabeth; Maclagan, Margaret (2004). "Regional and social differences in New Zealand: Phonology". In Schneider, Edgar W.; Burridge, Kate; Kortmann, Bernd; Mesthrie, Rajend; Upton, Clive (eds.). A Handbook of Varieties of English. Vol. 1: Phonology. Mouton de Gruyter. pp. 603–613. ISBN 3-11-017532-0.
- Grant, Lynne Elaine; Devlin, Gaylene A., eds. (1999). In Other words: A Dictionary of Expressions Used in New Zealand. Palmerston North: Dunmore Press. ISBN 9780864693303. OCLC 41524090.
- Kirkpatrick, A. (2003). The Emergence of New Zealand English. Oxford: Oxford University Press.
- Leland, Louis S. (1990). A Personal Kiwi-Yankee Dictionary (2nd ed.). Dunedin: John McIndoe. ISBN 9780868681221. OCLC 28147483.
- Orsman, H. W., ed. (1989). Heinemann New Zealand Dictionary (2nd ed.). Auckland: Heinemann Educational Books (NZ). ISBN 9780790000169. OCLC 154642838.
- Orsman, H. W., ed. (1997). The Dictionary of New Zealand English: A Dictionary of New Zealandisms on Historical Principles. Auckland: Oxford University Press. ISBN 9780195583472. OCLC 38750779.
- Trudgill, Peter; Hannah, Jean (2002). International English: A Guide to the Varieties of Standard English (4th ed.). London: Arnold.
