= I-Gami =

Toy

i-Gami is a toy in which small plastic pieces can be bent and snapped together to form small to large three-dimensional figures. It began production in 2006 by Plastic Play Inc. before being acquired by PlaSmart Inc.

== History ==
i-Gami is a toy product created by Boaz Axelrad, a Canadian. The toy takes inspiration from Japanese origami. Unlike origami, however, i-Gami is made from small pieces of plastic that can be bent and snapped together to form various figures, either in two- or three-dimensional form. Additionally, pieces can be disassembled and/or reused. Figures can be built either by following an instruction booklet which comes with each set, or by creating custom designs imagined by the creator.

i-Gami began production in 2006 by Plastic Play Inc., a company located in Oshawa before being acquired by Ottawa-based PlaSmart (best known for its success with the PlasmaCar) in 2009. PlaSmart had previously been the exclusive US distributor of the product since 2007. The company now owns all intellectual property rights to and manufacturing assets for the product line.

Currently, i-Gami is sold in box sets, ranging from beginner (54 pieces) to advanced (600 pieces).

== Reception ==
i-Gami has been generally well received by consumers. Consumers appreciate the fact that i-Gami promotes spatial learning, and also introduces the concept of counter pressure to young children. It has received multiple awards (see Awards section) since its entrance into the market.

== Awards ==
- 2008 iParenting Media - Excellent Product Award
- 2007 TDmonthly Innovation Award
- 2007 Dr. Toy - Top 100 Best Products
- 2006 Creative Child Magazine - Preferred Choice Award

== See also ==
PlaSmart Inc.
