= Correction paper =

Implement used to correct typing errors

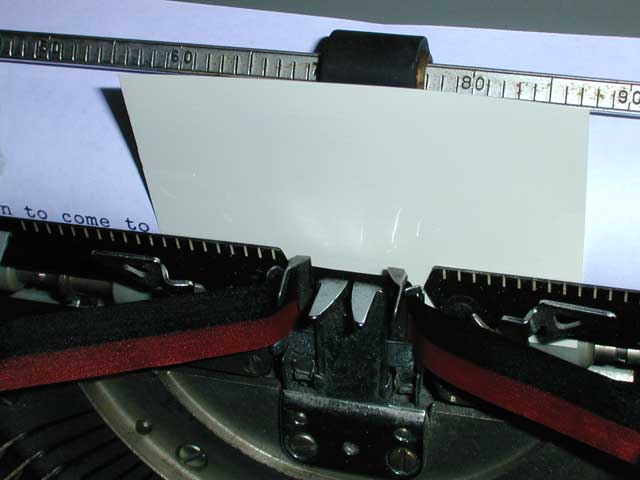
A sheet of correction paper in a typewriter.

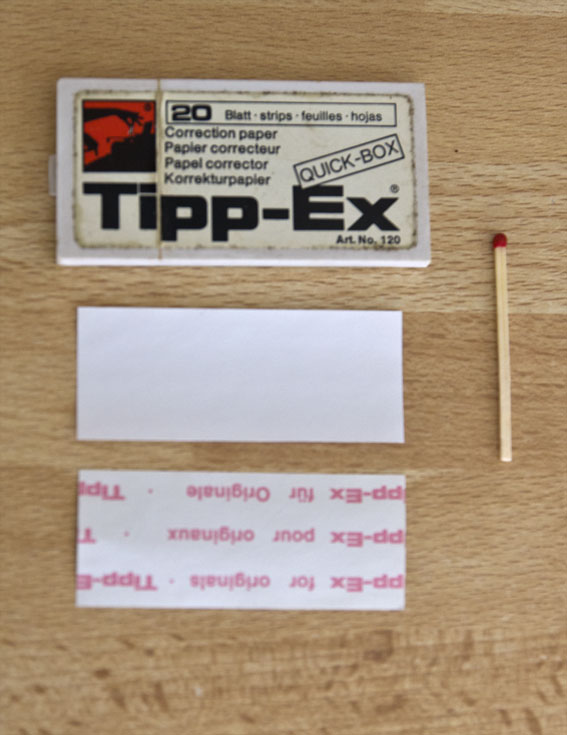
Tipp-ex correction paper 20130417

Correction paper, or correction film, its plastic based equivalent, is a tab of plastic with one side coated with white correction material. It is used to correct typing errors made when using a typewriter. When inserted between the paper and the ribbon, the impression of the typebar presses the shape of the character into the film, which prints the white correction material onto the paper, hiding the erroneous character and preparing the document for the correct character. It is however vital that the paper is reinserted into the carriage in the correct place to allow the letter to be retyped exactly on top of where it had originally been for this to work.

Correction paper was invented by Wolfgang Dabisch from Eltville, West Germany who filed a patent for it in November 1958. Soon after the filing of the patent, in 1959, German entrepreneur Otto Wilhelm Carls from Frankfurt founded the company Tipp-Ex GmbH & Co. Kg and Tipp-Ex was registered as a trademark in 1987. The Tipp-Ex name was used to distribute correction paper, and later correction tape and correction fluid worldwide. Demand for correction paper grew very quickly as prior to its invention there had been no way to erase typewriter errors.

The Tipp-Ex name is derived from the German word 'tippen' which means 'to type' and 'Ex' from the Latin for from, out or former.

In 1997, the Tipp-Ex brand was sold to Société Bic. Production of correction paper ceased around the year 2000 due to the end of the common usage of the typewriter.

Ko-rec-Type was a brand of typewriter correction film.

== See also ==
- Correction fluid
- Correction tape
- Tipp-Ex
