= Yummy Dough =

Baking mixture

Package of Yummy Dough

Yummy Dough (also known by its original German name Essknete) is a baking mixture, which requires addition of water and is then kneaded into a smooth dough. It was invented in 2005 and was first introduced to the market in 2007. The product's consistency is similar to that of a modeling clay such as Play-Doh. It is edible raw and can be baked. Yummy Dough contains colouring agents which are vegetable-based.

== History ==
Yummy Dough was invented by Stefan Kaczmarek, an IT worker from Idstein, Germany, in 2005. Kaczmarek credits his two daughters as having the original idea for the product because they "wanted to finally have dough they can play with as well as eat". It was first mentioned in a radio broadcast by the Hessischer Rundfunk, which drew significant attention towards the product. Kaczmarek reportedly had not planned to market the product, but decided otherwise following the positive reaction the broadcast went on to receive. It was premiered as a commercial product at Anuga Alimentary Exhibition in 2007, where it won the "Taste 07" award for innovation. This sparked the interest of several large grocery and toy chains; Kaczmarek declined an offer by German food manufacturer Dr. Oetker, instead founding his own company, 123 Nährmittel GmbH, to distribute the product nationwide. Yummy Dough was first sold by supermarkets in 2007, beginning with the German grocery chains Hit and REWE. The product is produced by the RUF Lebensmittelwerk in Quakenbrück.

In 2009, Yummy Dough became available in North America and is distributed by Canadian-based toy distributor PlaSmart Inc. The product was featured in season 4 of the Canadian version of Dragons' Den, in which Kaczmarek and his Canadian partner, Timothy Kimber of PlaSmart Inc., received C$500,000 from investors Kevin O'Leary, W. Brett Wilson and Jim Treliving, in exchange for a 3.5% cut of revenues, once the investment has been recouped. Further plans also include marketing the product in Asia.

Yummy Dough was pulled from the market and taken over by a German company with new branding and is only available in the EU marketplace.

== See also ==
- PlaSmart Inc.
