= Correction tape =

Tape used to correct mistakes during typing or handwriting

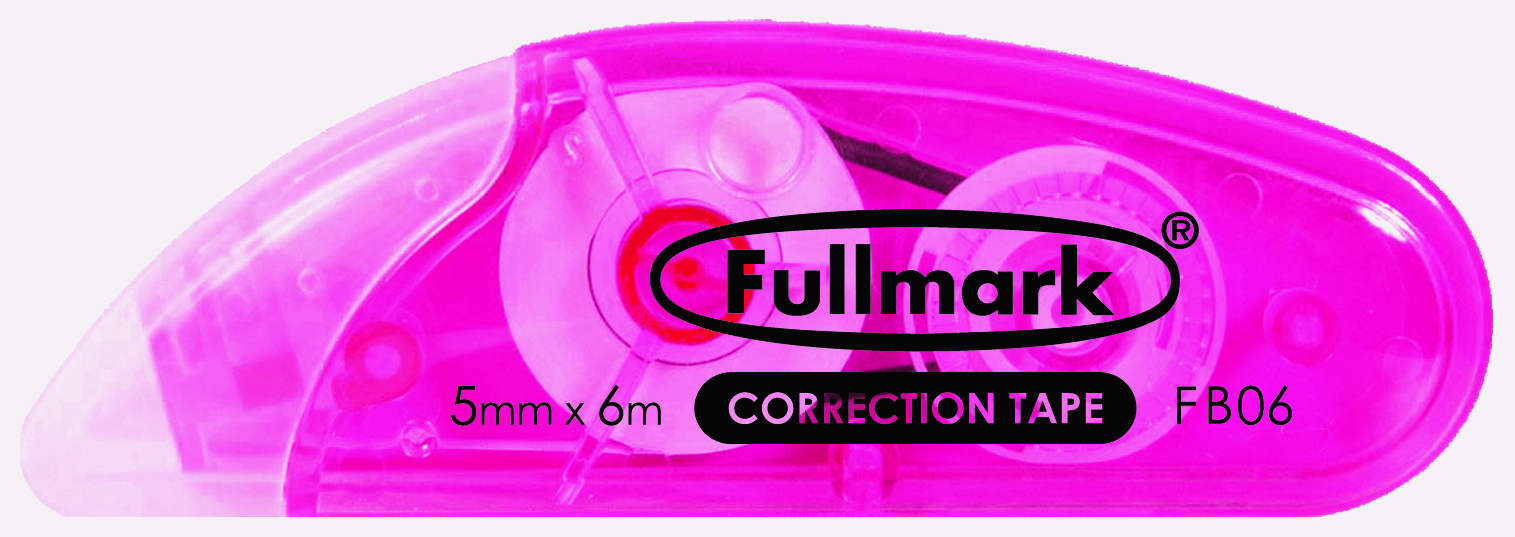
Model B in Pink

Using a correction tape

Correction tape is an alternative to correction fluid used to correct mistakes during handwriting, or, in some forms, typing on a typewriter. One side of the tape, which is placed against the area to cover, is coated in a white, opaque masking material. Pressure applied to the other side of the tape transfers this material to the paper. Unlike correction fluid, the covered area can be written on it immediately after applying because it doesn't need to dry. As it is solid, correction tape is not subject to misuse as an inhalant, unlike most correction fluids.

== Types ==
Correction tape is sold in short spools for hand use, or as long rolls to be used in typewriters, which apply sudden pressure when a key is struck, and can therefore apply the masking material in exactly the same shape and position as the erroneous character. Some versions of correction tape are sold in separate dispensers that are used to roll the tape onto paper directly, sometimes known as a correction mouse.

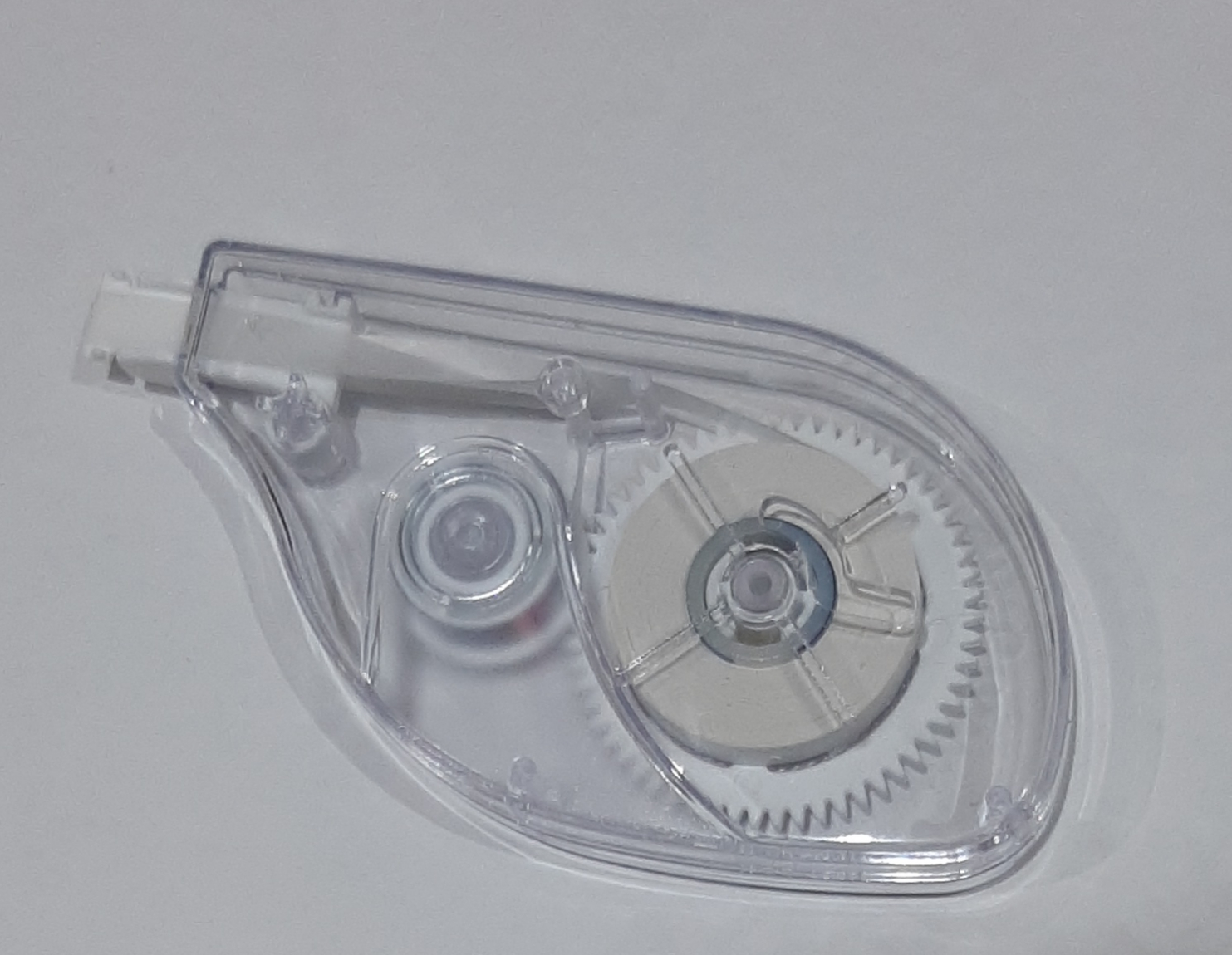
Correction tape in clear plastic (5mm x 8m)

The correction tapes can come in different variety of colours and designs in the current market. The materials of the tapes also varies, from having a paper-based tape that breaks easily to polyester film-based tapes that is more durable. The mechanism of the tapes differs too; the gear or the belt mechanism.

== See also ==
- Correction paper
- Correction fluid
- Liquid Paper
