= Bette Nesmith Graham =

American typist and inventor of Liquid Paper (1924–1980)

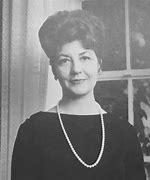
- Graham in the 1960s
- Born: Bette Clair McMurray; March 23, 1924; Dallas, Texas, U.S.
- Died: May 12, 1980 (aged 56); Richardson, Texas, U.S.
- Known for: Invention of Liquid Paper
- Spouses: Warren Nesmith (m. 1942–1946) Robert Graham (m. 1962–1975)
- Children: Michael

Bette Nesmith Graham (née McMurray, March 23, 1924 – May 12, 1980) was an American inventor, entrepreneur, businesswoman, and philanthropist from the state of Texas. While working as a secretary in the 1950s, she developed the correction fluid known as Liquid Paper. Graham founded the Liquid Paper Company in 1958, built it into a multimillion-dollar business with international reach, and sold it to Gillette Corporation in 1979. She was the mother of musician and actor Michael Nesmith, known primarily as a member of The Monkees.

== Early life, family, and early career ==
On March 23, 1924, Bette Clair McMurray was born in Dallas, Texas, the daughter of a vehicle wholesaler and a housewife with artistic pursuits. Bette's sister Yvonne described her as "strong-willed". At 17, she dropped out of Alamo Heights High School in San Antonio and applied for secretarial positions despite not knowing how to type. She was hired and subsequently sent to secretarial school to receive formal training.

In 1942, McMurray married her high school sweetheart, Warren Nesmith. During his deployment in World War II, she continued working as a secretary and attended night classes to complete her GED. On December 30, 1942, she gave birth to her son, Michael Nesmith. Nesmith was a musician who later became the guitarist of The Monkees. She divorced Warren Nesmith in 1946 after he returned from the war, and she spent the following years working in various secretarial and design positions. Following her divorce from Nesmith, McMurray raised her son as a single mother.

== Liquid Paper ==
In 1951, McMurray was executive secretary for W. W. Overton, the chairman of the board of the Texas Bank and Trust, and used an IBM electric typewriter. The machine made it difficult to fix typos, and McMurray was frustrated that a small error could make it necessary to retype entire pages. She painted the bank's holiday window display to earn extra money, and the process of painting over a design mistake to re-do it inspired her to create the first correctional fluid prototypes.

McMurray mixed white water-based tempera paint to match the color of her workplace stationery; she then applied it over errors with a watercolor brush. Using this method, she successfully concealed mistakes, though it could be seen as cutting corners or cheating at her job. "I tried to keep it a secret," she said, adding that "for five years I did just that". About a dozen colleagues asked McMurray for the product, so she created a label and the name "Mistake Out". She continued to develop the product from her North Dallas home, mixing it in a kitchen blender and pouring it into empty nail polish bottles, ketchup bottles, and mustard bottles. She formed the Mistake Out Company in 1956. McMurray hired her son and his friends to assemble bottles of the product in her garage for $1 an hour.

McMurray developed alternative formulas for quicker drying times and better application brushes. Sales were about 100 bottles per month in 1957; they increased fivefold when the correctional liquid appeared in The Office magazine, leading to a large corporate order from General Electric. In 1958, McMurray was fired from her secretarial job after mistakenly signing correspondence with the notation "The Mistake Out Company". After losing her job, McMurray worked at her correctional fluid business full-time. That same year, she renamed her business the Liquid Paper Company and applied for a patent and trademark. McMurray was the chief executive officer of the company.

In 1962, McMurray married Robert Graham, who joined her in operating Liquid Paper as it expanded. In 1964, headquarters moved to a work shed. In 1965, the company moved to a single-family home. By 1968, the company "had become a multimillion-dollar organization, breaking ground on a huge business and manufacturing facility in Dallas, Texas. LPC scaled internationally and eventually opened offices and manufacturing plants in Canada, England, Belgium and Australia". Bette Graham continued to hold a 49% stake in the company. By 1975, "Liquid Paper was producing 25 million bottles a year and holding a vast share of a multimillion-dollar market that had spawned several competitors, like Wite-Out". The company's growth and success, which occurred without outside capital, made Graham wealthy.

Bette Graham was raised Baptist and converted to Christian Science in 1942. Her faith influenced the development of her "Statement of Policy", a broad corporate document that covered topics ranging from her belief in a "Supreme Being" to Liquid Paper's decentralized decision making and emphasis on product quality over profit. Graham believed that women brought a nurturing and humanistic quality to the male world of business. At the Liquid Paper headquarters, she built a green belt with a fish pond, an employee library, and a childcare center. Liquid Paper offered employees extensive benefits, including a retirement program, a continuing education program, and an employee-owned credit union.

Graham went through an "acrimonious" divorce from Robert Graham in 1975. Robert Graham also tried to push her out of Liquid Paper. For a time, she was not allowed on company premises. Nevertheless, "despite declining health, Graham managed to wrest back control of the company". She sold Liquid Paper to Gillette Corporation in 1979 for at least $47.5 million. (Note: While some sources say Graham sold Liquid Paper for $47.5 million, another says she sold it for $48.5 million.) She died the following year.

== Philanthropy ==
Graham established "the Gihon Foundation, which gave grants and financial support to promote women in the arts, and the Bette Clair McMurray Foundation, which did the same for women in business".

A portion of Graham's estate financed the Gihon Foundation, which established the Council on Ideas, a think tank with a retreat center located north of Santa Fe, New Mexico. The Council on Ideas was active from 1990 to 2000. An additional portion of Graham's estate financed the Betty Clair McMurray Foundation, which funds programs such as the "Texas Women, A Celebration of History" exhibit, career guidance for unwed mothers, shelter and counseling for battered women, and college scholarships for mature women.

== Death ==
On May 12, 1980, at the age of 56, Graham died due to complications of a stroke. Graham's only son, musician Michael Nesmith, inherited half of his mother's estate of over $50 million. In 2018, The New York Times published a belated obituary for Graham as part of its "Overlooked No More" series.
