= Tipp-Ex =

Brand of correction fluid

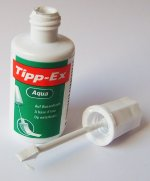
A bottle of the Tipp-ex aqua

Tipp-Ex is a brand of correction fluid and other related products that is popular throughout Europe. It was also the name of the German company (Tipp-Ex GmbH & Co. KG) that produced the products in the Tipp-Ex line. While Tipp-Ex is a trademark name for correction products, in some countries it has become a genericised trademark: to tippex or to tippex out means to erase, either generally or with correction fluid.

== History ==
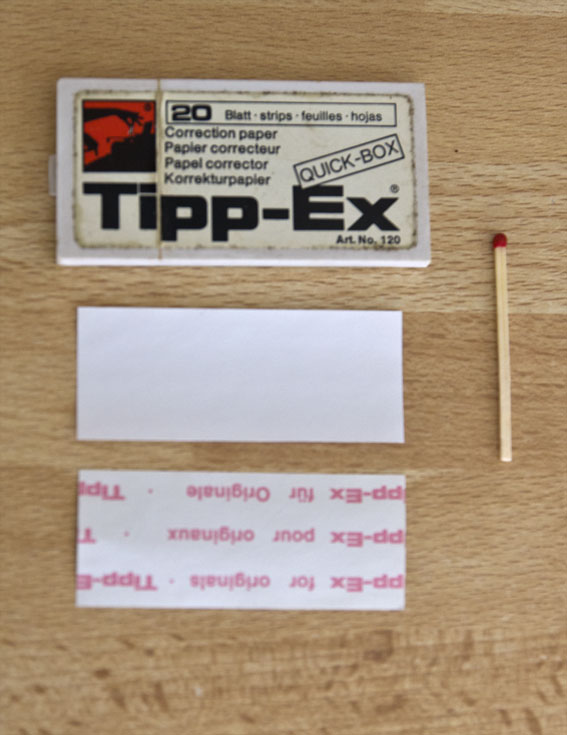
Tipp-Ex correction paper

Tipp-Ex correction paper was invented by Wolfgang Dabisch from Eltville, West Germany, who filed a patent in 1958 on Colored film for the correction of typing errors (German: Tippfehler). He subsequently founded a company of the same name. Shortly after that a Tipp-Ex Sales & Distribution company (Tipp-Ex Vertrieb GmbH & Co. KG) was founded in Frankfurt by Otto Carls. This company still exists under the name of Tipp-Ex GmbH & Co. KG close to Frankfurt. Tipp-Ex became a registered trademark with the German patent office in 1987.

Earlier, in 1951, Bette Nesmith Graham invented the first correction fluid by putting tempura water-based paint in a bottle, and a watercolour brush for application, and began marketing the product in 1956 as Mistake Out. She changed the name to Liquid Paper, in 1979 it was bought by Gillette for $47m.

Tipp-Ex GmbH only started to produce white correction fluid in 1965 under the brand Tipp-Ex, but also as C-fluid.

As a result of the invention of Tipp-Ex, it became possible to erase a typographical error made on a typewriter. The typewriter would be backspaced to the letter that was to be changed, the correction paper would be placed behind the ribbon, and the mistyped letter would be re-typed. The system only worked if the typewriter repositioned the re-typed letter in exactly the same place as originally typed, which could be problematic if returning to a previous line.

Demand for this correction paper grew very quickly and brought interest from German and international distributors.

In 1992 Tipp-Ex introduced its first correction tape, followed in 1995 by the successful Pocket Mouse which worked as a best seller. In 1998, the correction pen was launched. The range was extended to erasers, and in 2000, the new foam applicator was adapted to all the correction fluid bottles.

In 1997, Société Bic acquired Tipp-Ex.

== Usage ==
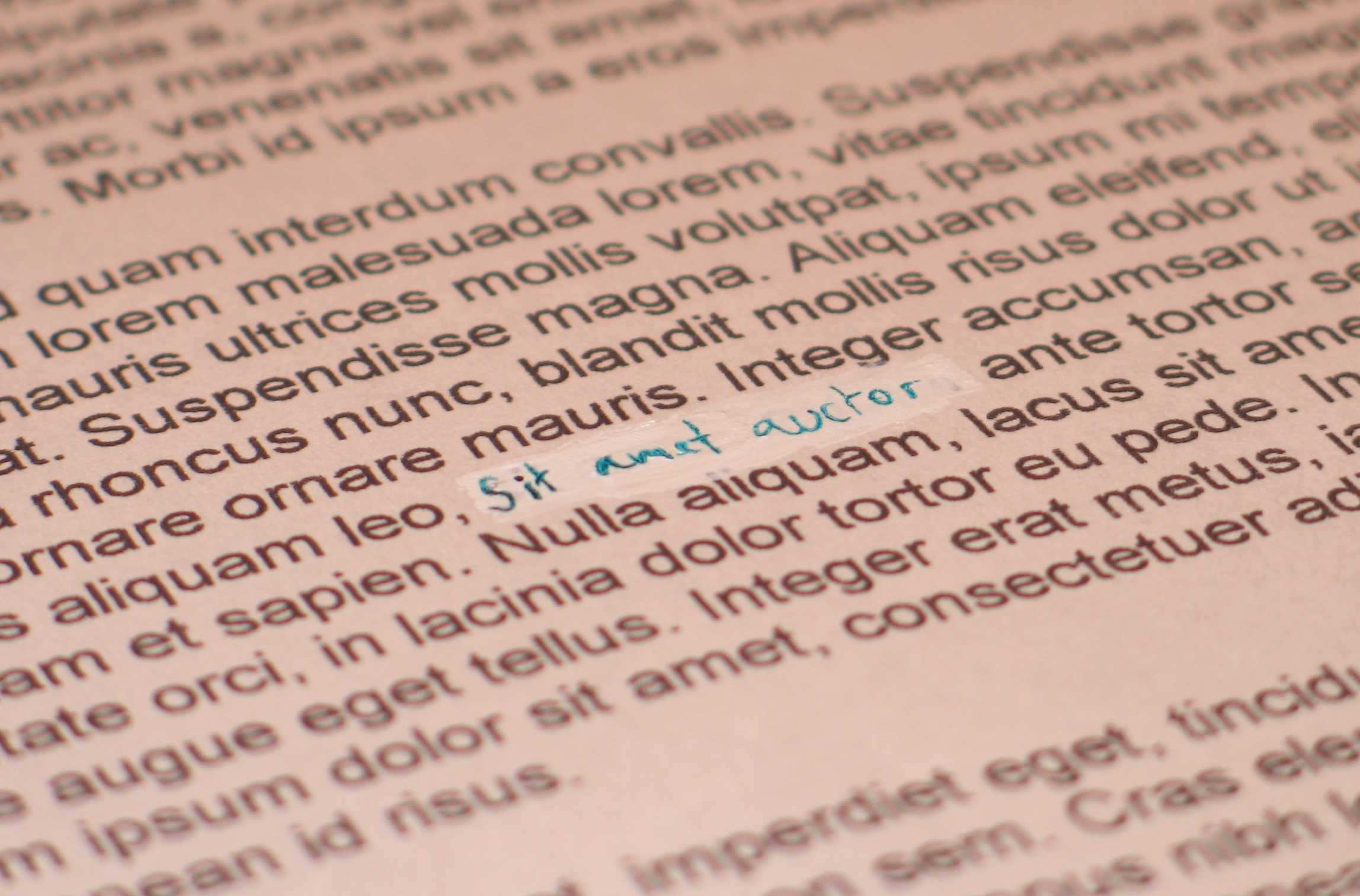
Tipp-Ex can often be written on after it has dried.

Tipp-Ex correction fluid is a white liquid. It is used for painting over mistakes in a piece of writing. A brush (which was later replaced by a foam applicator) is attached to the cap, so when the bottle is closed, the brush is immersed in the fluid. When unscrewed, the brush is covered in liquid Tipp-Ex which is then painted over the mistake. However, it is still possible to see that the product has been used, and also the original content if the paper is held up to a light.

If the contents of a Tipp-Ex bottle have been exposed to too much air (for example, if the cap has been unscrewed too long or if the bottle is half-full and there is air filling the space), the fluid becomes thicker, and sometimes even solidifies. To help prevent this, Tipp-Ex released a product called "Tipp-Ex thinner", a few drops of which are mixed with the contents of a bottle of partially dried Tipp-Ex to thin it. This extends the lifetime of a bottle.

One must write with a ball point pen on top of Tipp-Ex, as a liquid ink pen will smudge. Gel ink will require a few seconds to fully dry, but can be used if no ball point pen is available.

== Toxicology ==
The organic solvent 1,1,1-trichloroethane was originally used as a thinner in the product. This solvent is readily absorbed by the lungs via inhalation. It passes readily through the blood–brain barrier and may be lethal following acute exposure. 1,1,1-trichloroethane is also an 'ozone depleter', being one of the substances responsible for causing damage to the Earth's ozone layer. For both reasons, it has not been added to Tipp-Ex since 2000, and it has been replaced by aliphatic hydrocarbons.

== See also ==
- Liquid Paper
- Wite-Out
