= PlasmaCar =

Toy car

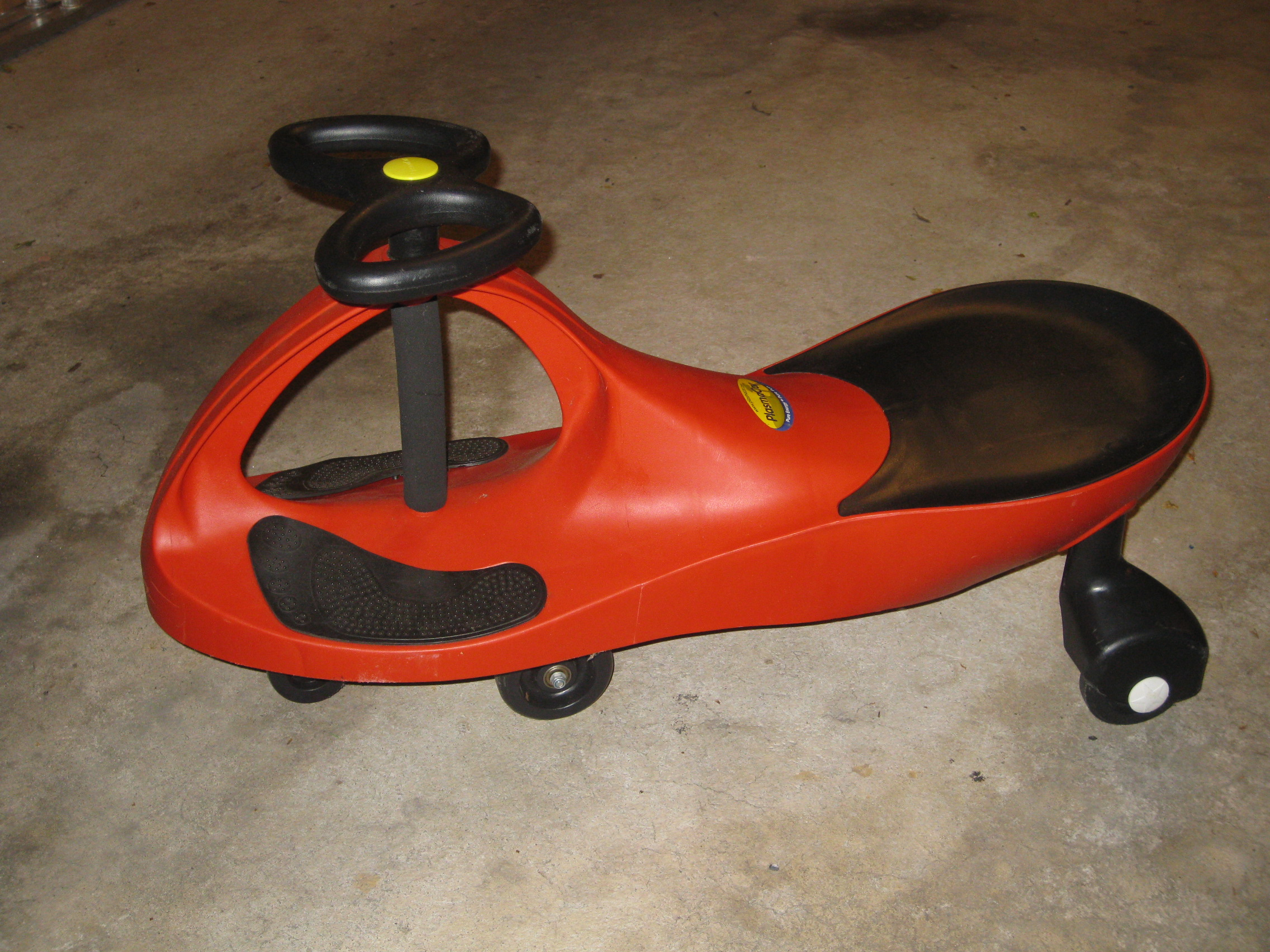
- Type: Ride-on Toy Car
- Company: PlaSmart
- Country: Canada
- Availability: 2003–present
- Official website

The PlasmaCar is a plastic ride-on toy car designed for children (can be adapted for adults; see below), made popular by Canadian toy distributor PlaSmart. The PlasmaCar can be propelled by wiggling the front steering wheel which is attached to two pivoting wheels touching the ground. It harnesses the natural forces of inertia, centrifugal force, gravity, and friction in order to drive the car forward and backward. It does not require a power source such as batteries, fuel, pedals, or gears - it simply runs on the child's ability to wiggle the steering wheel. It can be operated indoors and/or outdoors, though it works best on a smooth, flat surface.

== History ==
In early December 2002, an Ottawa entrepreneur named Timothy Kimber discovered the unique ride-on toy as he was shopping in an Ottawa shopping center. It was then called the Fun Car, and was on display at the mall, free for children to test drive. Kimber, fascinated with the product, located the Asian distributor and proceeded to ask questions regarding the Fun Car. Kimber discovered that while the Fun Car sold well in China, it had virtually no presence in Canada or the United States. Surprised by the news, Kimber sought out to bring the Fun Car to North America because of its marketing potential. After much conversation with the distributor, Kimber negotiated to assume distribution and marketing rights for the Fun Car in North America.

In 2003, Kimber set out to bring the Fun Car to the North American market. With approximately 1,500 ride-on units, Kimber put together a plan to expose the toy, and started by displaying it at the 2003 Canadian Toy and Hobby Show. Within a month, Kimber had created a company name (PlaSmart - pronounced Play Smart), website, and provided marketing materials for the Fun Car, including a demo video. More importantly, he decided to change the product name from the Fun Car (deemed too generic and dull) to the PlasmaCar, a name he borrowed from the world of consumer electronics where the hottest "toy" for adults was the Plasma TV. The name change caught the attention of customers and retailers, and the PlasmaCar became a popular item at trade shows. It was a big hit among children, and can even support adults weighing upwards of 100 kg.

With the popularity of the PlasmaCar rising, Kimber moved the business to an Ottawa office and warehouse unit. Distribution of the PlasmaCar was handed over to a more established supplier with confirmed connections in the toy industry. However, the arrangement was short-lived. Within six months, distribution rights returned to PlaSmart in late 2003.

The PlasmaCar is currently sold worldwide.

== Physics ==
The PlasmaCar design includes six wheels, but only four touch the ground. The first two wheels located at the front of the vehicle do not touch the ground (a common misconception) or spin: they are merely there for stability and safety in case the rider leans forward or drives into an elevated surface (such as a street curb). The next set of wheels of the PlasmaCar are attached to the steering wheel by a lever, in such a way that they are located behind the axis of rotation of the steering column. The torque applied to the steering wheel causes a lateral friction force by the wheels on the ground, a force parallel to the axle and perpendicular to the direction the wheels are rolling. If a component of this force points to the back of the car, the reaction force of the ground on the car (by Newton's "action/reaction" law) points partly forward and accelerates the car. This is the force that drives the car forward and it ultimately comes from the force exerted on the handlebars. In-line skaters make a similar force by repeatedly pulling both skates laterally inward in a criss cross fashion in order to accelerate themselves. Skateboarders do a similar thing by pulling laterally inward while executing a series of alternating, tight turns. The final set of wheels (located at the back of the vehicle) spin normally, but do not pivot.

== Reception ==
The PlasmaCar has received critical reception from the toy industry, as well as customers. Additionally, it is the most successful product in PlaSmart's product line to date. It has received numerous awards (see awards section), as well as favorable customer reviews on websites such as Chapters (4.5 out of 5 stars), Amazon.com (5 out of 5 stars), and Fat Brain Toys (5 out of 5 stars). In 2009, the PlasmaCar ranked 7th on DisneyFamily.com's Top Action Figures and Toys for Kids list.

== Adaptation ==
The plasma car can be modified for heavier adults/teenagers by putting in a metal straight axle where the rear wheels would originally be.

== Awards, nominations, and recognitions ==
- 2009 DisneyFamily.com - #7 Top Action Figures & Toys for Kids
- 2009 DisneyFamily.com - #1 Top Spring & Summer Kid Essentials
- 2009 National Parenting Center - Seal of Approval
- 2008 National Parenting Center - Seal of Approval
- 2008 iParenting Media - Greatest Product Winner in the Toy Category
- 2008 Fat Brain Toy Award in the Active Play Category
- 2007 TIA (Toy Industry Association) - Toy of the Year Nomination for Outdoor Toy of the Year
- 2007 TD Monthly - Top Toy Award
- 2006 TIA (Toy Industry Association) - Toy of the Year Nomination for Outdoor Toy of the Year
- 2006 TIA (Toy Industry Association) - Specialty Toy of the Year
- 2006 Learning Express Stores - Most Innovative New Product
- 2006 Oppenheim Toy Portfolio - Platinum Award
- 2005 NETS (Neighborhood Toy Stores of Canada) - Most Innovative Toy of the Year
- 2005 Oppenheim Toy Portfolio - Gold Seal Award
- 2005 Dr. Toy - Best Vacation Products
- 2005 Creative Child - Seal of Excellence
- 2005 National Parenting Center - Seal of Approval
- 2004 CTA (Canadian Toy Association) - Hot Toys of the Holiday Season
- 2004 Canadian Toy Testing Council - Recognition
- 2003 NETS (Neighborhood Toy Stores of Canada) - Gold Star Toy Award
- 2003 Today's Parent - Top Toy List (Wow! Status)
- 2001 International Patent Fair, Hong Kong - Gold Medal

== See also ==
- PlaSmart Inc.
- Roller racer
- Flying Turtle
- plasmaBike
