= Wite-Out =

US brand of correction fluid

- Product type: Correction fluid
- Current owner: Société Bic (1992-present)
- Introduced: 1966
- Related brands: Liquid Paper, Tipp-Ex
- Previous owners: Wite-Out Products, Inc.
- Registered as a trademark in: United States (1974)

Wite-Out is a registered trademark for a brand of correction fluid, originally created for use with photocopies, and manufactured by the BIC corporation.

== History ==
Wite-Out dates to 1966, when Edwin Johanknecht an insurance-company clerk, sought to address a problem he observed in correction fluid available at the time: a tendency to smudge ink on photostatic copies when it was applied. Johanknecht enlisted the help of his associate George Kloosterhouse, a basement waterproofer who experimented with chemicals, and together they developed their own correction fluid, introduced as "Wite-Out WO-1 Erasing Liquid".

In 1971, they incorporated as Wite-Out Products, Inc. The trademark "Wite-Out" was registered by the United States Patent and Trademark Office on February 5, 1974. The application listed the date of "first use in commerce" as January 27, 1966.

Early forms of Wite-Out sold through 1981 were water-based and hence water-soluble. While this allowed simple cleaning, it also had the problem of long drying times. The formula also did not work well on non-photostatic media such as typewritten copy.

The company was bought in 1981 by Archibald Douglas. Douglas, as chairman, led the company toward solvent-based formulas with faster drying times. Three different formulas were created, each optimized for different media. New problems arose: a separate bottle of thinner was required, and the solvent used was known to contribute to ozone depletion. The company addressed these problems in July 1990 with the introduction of a reformulated "For Everything" correction fluid.

The French corporation Société Bic acquired Wite-Out Products in 1992.

In 2017, sales of Wite-Out grew nearly 10 percent globally with AdWeek suggesting that the increase in sales was due to artists using the fluid as paint.

== See also ==
- Liquid Paper
- Tipp-Ex
