= Liquid Paper =

Brand of correction fluid

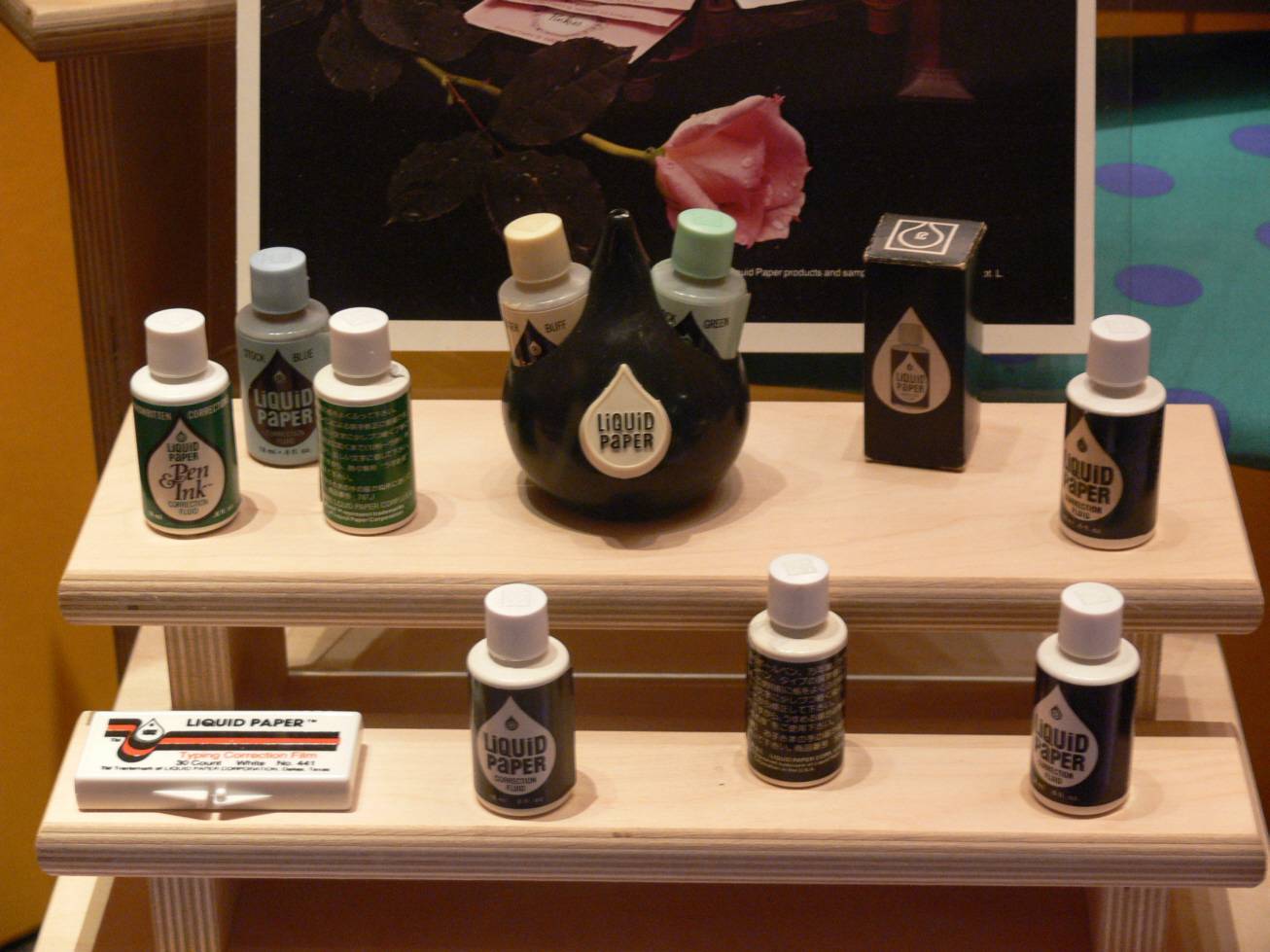
Liquid Paper products at The Women's Museum in Dallas, Texas

Liquid Paper is an American brand of the Newell Brands company marketed internationally that sells correction fluid, correction pens, and correction tape.

== Product history ==
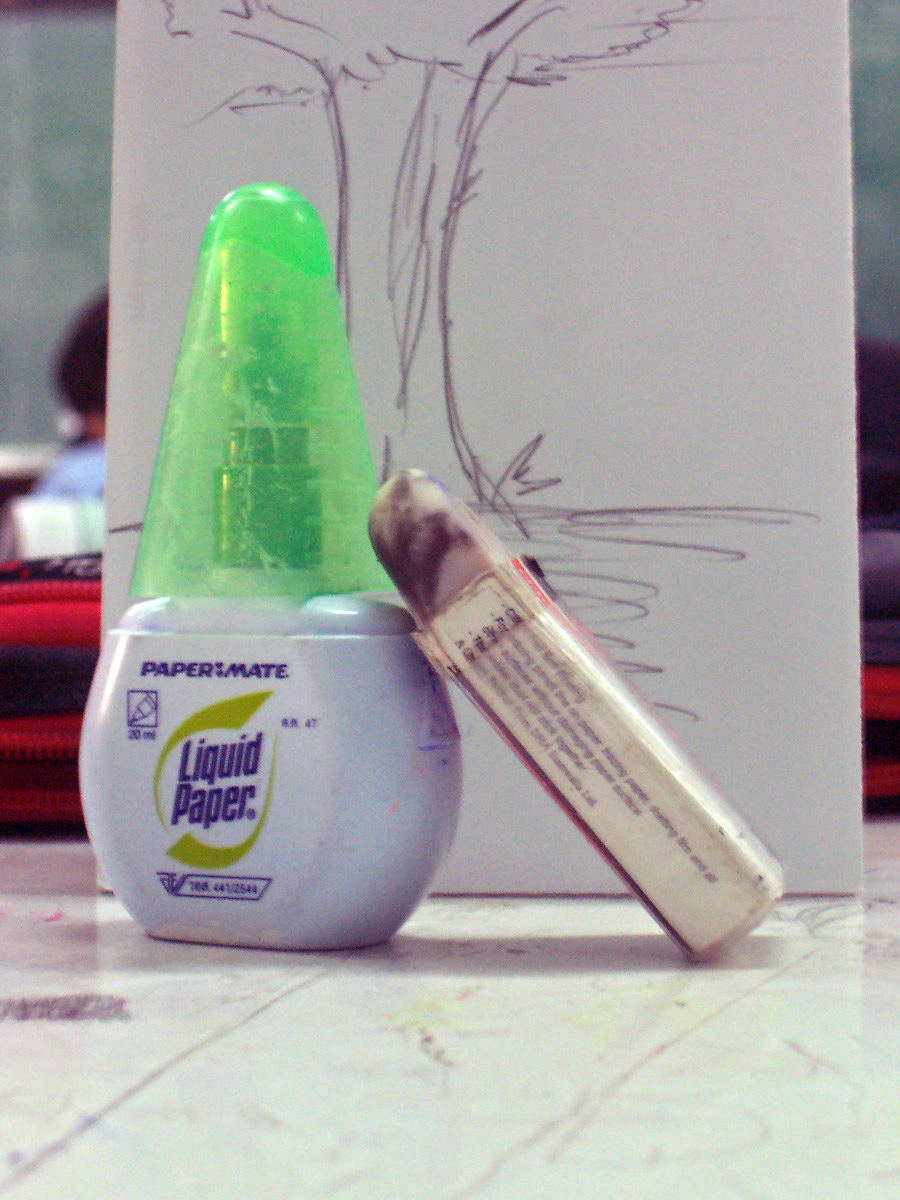
Liquid Paper

In 1956, Bette Nesmith Graham (mother of future Monkees guitarist Michael Nesmith) invented the first correction fluid in her kitchen. Working as a typist, she used to make many mistakes and always strove for a way to correct them. Starting on a basis of tempera paint she mixed with a common kitchen blender, she called the fluid "Mistake Out" and started to provide her co-workers with small bottles on which the brand's name was displayed.

Graham formed the Mistake Out Company in 1956. She developed alternative formulas for quicker drying times and better application brushes. Sales were about 100 bottles per month in 1957; however, they increased fivefold when the correctional liquid appeared in The Office magazine, which led to a large corporate order from General Electric.

Graham was fired from her typist job after she accidentally put her own company’s name on a sheet of her employer’s company letterhead. She subsequently decided to devote all her time to Mistake Out. In 1958, Graham renamed her business the Liquid Paper Company and applied for a patent and trademark. By 1968, the company "had become a multimillion-dollar organization, breaking ground on a huge business and manufacturing facility in Dallas, Texas. LPC scaled internationally and eventually opened offices and manufacturing plants in Canada, England, Belgium and Australia". By 1975, "Liquid Paper was producing 25 million bottles a year and holding a vast share of a multimillion-dollar market that had spawned several competitors, like Wite-Out".

Graham sold Liquid Paper to Gillette Corporation in 1979. (Note: While some sources say Graham sold Liquid Paper for $47.5 million, another says she sold it for $48.5 million.)

== Acquisition ==
In 2000, the Liquid Paper product and brand name was acquired by Newell Rubbermaid (later Newell Brands). In some regions of the world, Liquid Paper is endorsed by Papermate, a widely known writing instruments brand also owned by Newell.

== Ingredients ==
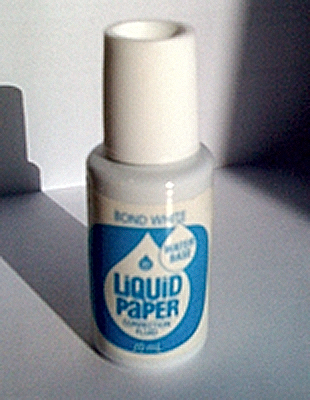
A traditionally shaped bottle of Liquid Paper

As of 2009, MSDSs list Liquid Paper as containing titanium dioxide, solvent naphtha, mineral spirits, resins, dispersant, and fragrances.

Liquid Paper came under scrutiny in the 1980s due to concerns over recreational sniffing. The organic solvent 1,1,1-trichloroethane (TCA) was used as a thinner in the product. Liquid Paper containing TCA was thought to be toxic and carcinogenic, but later studies showed that although the thinner was toxic there was no evidence of carcinogenicity. There were several studies linking fatalities to the TCA contained in correction fluids, including Liquid Paper.

In 1989, Gillette reformulated Liquid Paper without TCA in response to a complaint under California Proposition 65.

== See also ==
- Correction fluid
- Correction tape
- Pentel
- Wite-Out
- Tipp-Ex
