= PlaSmart =

Canadian toy distributor

PlaSmart Inc.
- Type: Private
- Industry: Toys, Distributor
- Founded: 2003
- Founder: Tim Kimber, Founder
- Headquarters: Ottawa, ON, Canada
- Area served: Worldwide
- Key people: Tim Kimber, Founder; Anne Leahy, CEO
- Products: Educational toys
- Revenue: $10,500,000 CAD
- Number of employees: 14 employees 90 sales contractors
- Website: www.plasmarttoys.com www.plasmacar.com

PlaSmart is a Canadian-based, global toy distributor located in Ottawa, Ontario that specializes in toys and games that develop motor skills, hand-eye coordination, problem-solving, and creative play. Formed in 2003 by Canadian entrepreneur Timothy Kimber, PlaSmart launched its first product, the PlasmaCar, to the North American market. The company has since grown to 14 employees and over 90 sales contractors, with products available worldwide in more than 60 countries.

== History ==
In December 2002, Timothy Kimber met Bin Chen, who was in business importing relatively inexpensive products from China to sell at retail in an Ottawa-area mall. One product Chen sold was an unusual ride-on toy that was not powered by batteries or foot pedals, but by moving the steering wheel back and forth. After learning that the product was not selling well in North America, Kimber negotiated the rights to distribute and market the product himself under the name PlasmaCar.

At the beginning of 2003, Kimber founded PlaSmart and displayed the PlasmaCar at the Canadian Toy and Hobby Show, a trade fair for toy retailers. Kimber has said that while PlaSmart was pressured to immediately enter the American toy market, the company made a deliberate decision to spend the first two years learning about the Canadian toy industry. In 2005, PlaSmart attended the New York Toy Fair and expanded distribution into the United States. PlasmaCar received positive reviews in major U.S. publications, including New York Magazine, TIME Magazine, and Wired.

In 2006, PlaSmart moved into an Ottawa office and warehouse unit and expanded sales into Germany, its first international market. PlaSmart announced the opening of a permanent showroom in Kowloon, Hong Kong in June 2010, as a result of growing international demand for its products. As U.S. sales continued to expand in April 2012, PlaSmart closed its Ottawa warehouse and currently ships products destined for North American markets from its warehouses in Pennsylvania and California. Since the release of the PlasmaCar, PlaSmart has expanded its offerings to include a range of battery-free toys that meet its 'smart and simple' philosophy.

In 2008, PlaSmart was listed as Canada's 13th fastest-growing company in Canada on ProfitGUIDE's Profit 100 rankings, and in 2010 it reached the position of 8th fastest. PlaSmart was listed as the 7th fastest growing company in Ottawa by the Ottawa Business Journal.

== Products ==
- PlasmaCar - A ride-on toy without batteries, gears, or pedals. The driver is propelled up to 6 miles per hour by turning the steering wheel. Intended for ages three and up.
- PlasmaBike - A balance bike intended for ages 18-months and up. The PlasmaBike is designed to help children develop gross motor skills and transition to conventional 2-wheel riding.
- Fun Slides Carpet Skates - Indoor skates designed for gliding over carpet. Intended for ages 6 and up.
- The Original Doodle Art - Poster coloring kits. Each kit includes 12 non-toxic, dual-tipped pens. Intended for ages 8 and up.
- Threadz - Reusable loom kits for hooking hats, purses, and scarves out of yarn. Intended for ages 6 and up.
- Morphology - A competitive guessing game where players illustrate words with building pieces. Intended for ages 8 and up.
- Squashed - A 3D board game where players can rotate the cube to 'squash' a side and remove opponents from play. Intended for ages 6 and up.
- Drop Shot - A race-to-the-finish board game, featuring a special hazard: Players drop a ball to knock pieces back. Intended for ages 6 and up.
- Digits In a Box - A ten puzzle pieces shaped like numbers which can be solved in over 4000 combinations. Intended for ages 8 and up.
- Orbo - A matching puzzle where the player snaps balls into colored rings; pieces can be rearranged for a new challenge. Intended for ages 4 and up.
- Gelli Baff – A non-toxic powder that soaks up to 400 times its own weight in water, turning bath water into goo and back again. Intended for ages 5 and up.
- Wonky Wheels - A toy car steered by a finger that wobbles, rotates, and moves unpredictably. Intended for ages 3 and up.
- Smart Mat – Large multi-purpose EVA foam play mats for use indoors or outdoors. Intended for ages 0 and up.
- Stomp Rocket (Canada Only) - Fires foam rockets by stomping on a launch pad. Intended for ages 6 and up.
- OgoSport (Canada Only) - Hand-trampolines for throwing, catching, or bouncing, alone or with others. Ages vary, from 4+.
