= Correction fluid =

Fluid applied to paper to mask errors in text

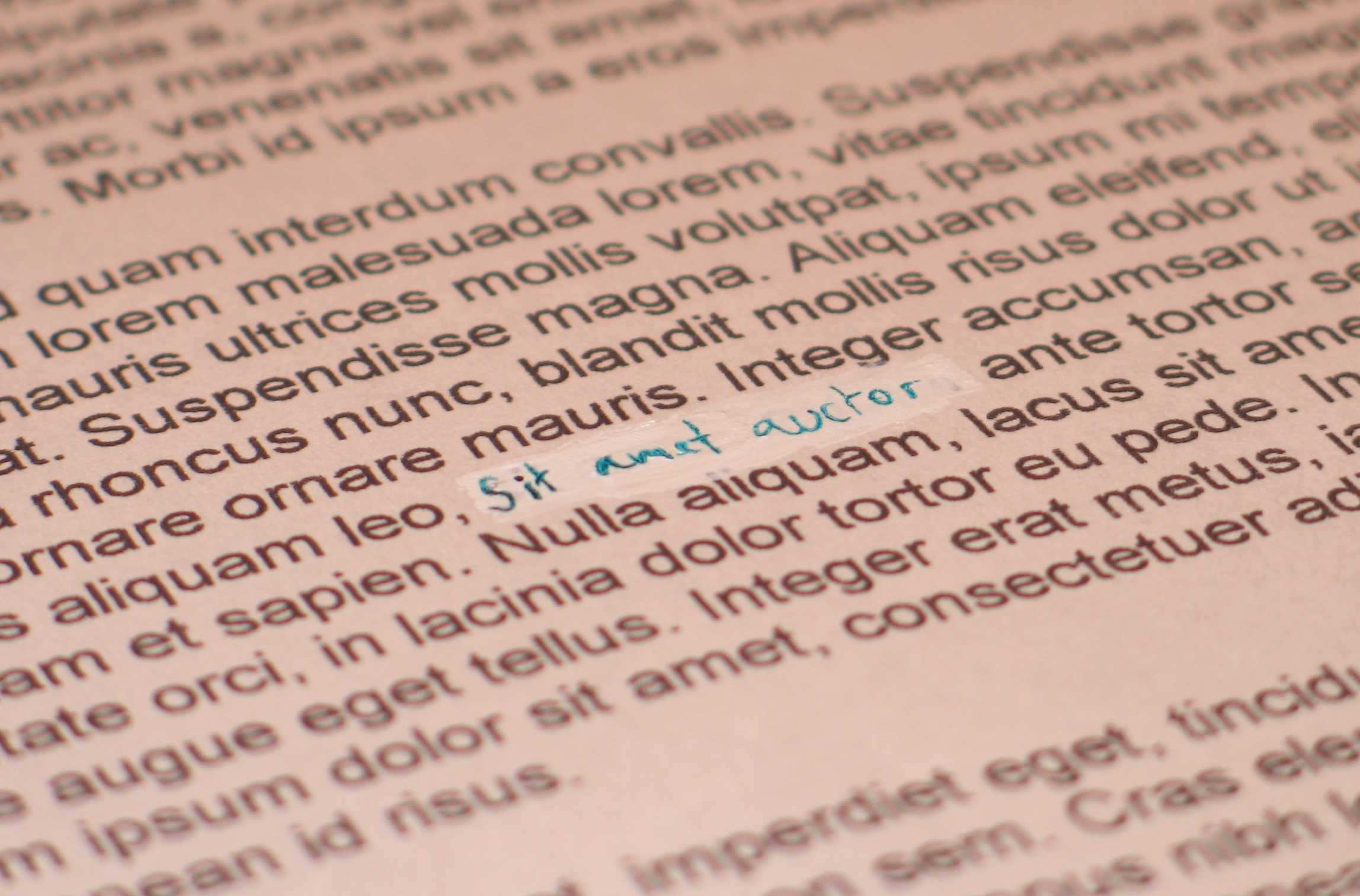
Correction fluid can be written on after it has dried.

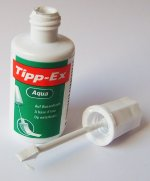
Correction fluid bottle

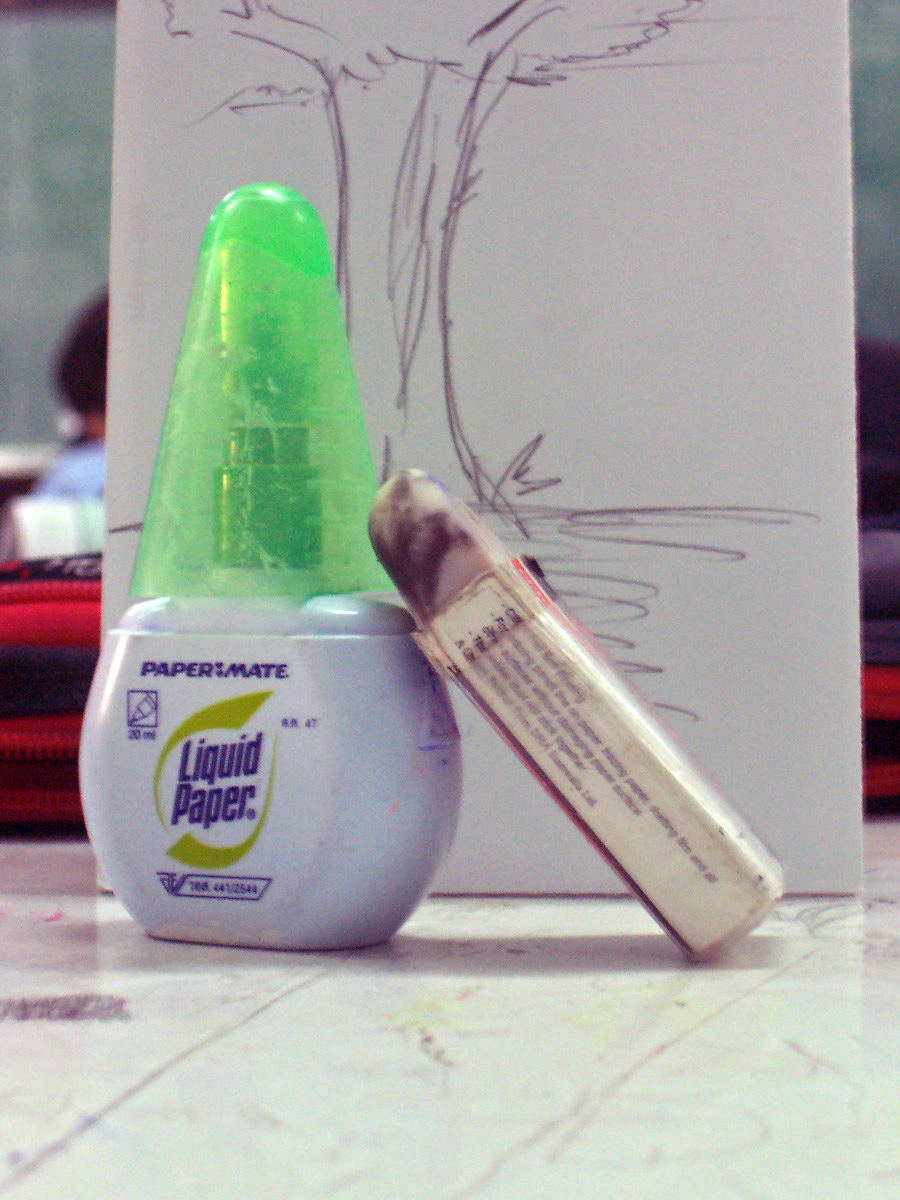
Correction fluid bottle

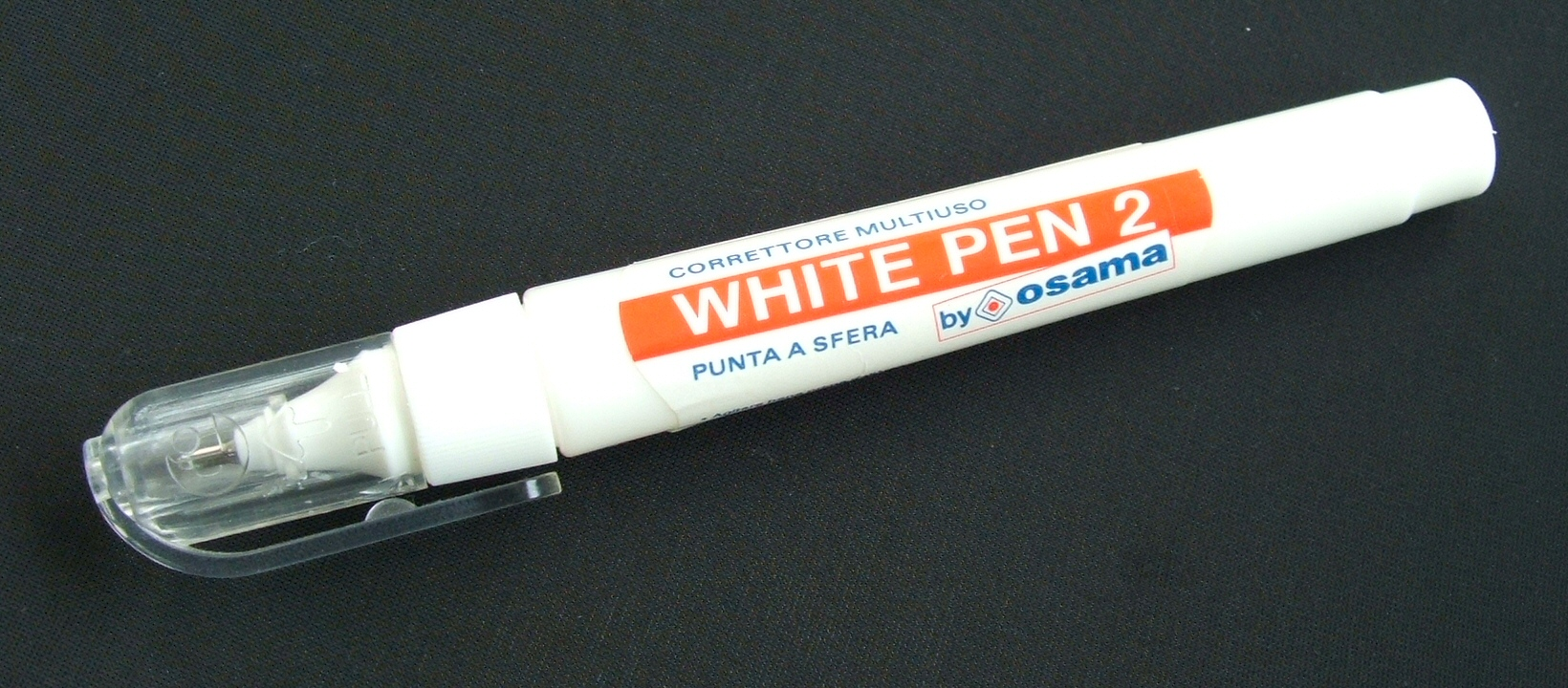
Correction pen

A correction fluid (or correction liquid) is an opaque, usually white fluid applied to paper to mask errors in text. Once dried, it can be handwritten, typewritten, or hand drawn upon. It is typically packaged in small bottles, with lids attached to brushes (or triangular pieces of foam) that dip into the fluid. The brush applies the fluid to the paper.

Before the invention of word processors, correction fluid greatly facilitated the production of typewritten documents. One of the first forms of correction fluid was invented in 1956 by American secretary Bette Nesmith Graham, founder of Liquid Paper. With the advent of colored paper stocks for office use, manufacturers began producing their fluids in various matching colors, particularly reds, blues and yellows.

== Composition ==
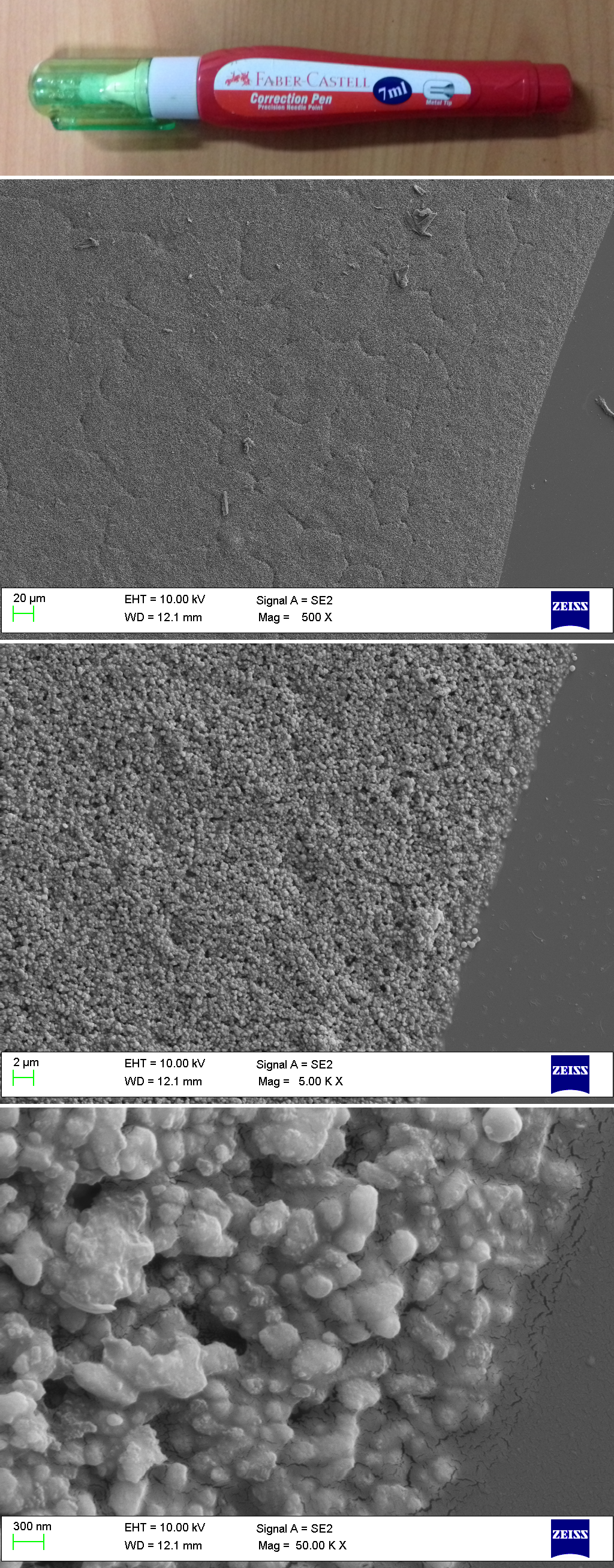
Correction fluid copolymer visualized under scanning electron microscopy (SEM). The micro-structural details of the copolymer resin are visible under high magnifications. Correction fluid was applied on a glass base (visible in the bottom-right corner of all SEM images).

The exact composition of correction fluid varies between manufacturers, but most fluids are composed of an opacifying agent, a solvent (or thinner) and an adulterant 'fragrance' to discourage abusive inhaling. The opacifying agent can be composed of a mixture of titanium dioxide, latex, and other polymer resins.

Thinner originally contained toluene, which was banned due to its toxicity. Later, it contained 1,1,1-trichloroethane, a skin irritant now widely banned under the Montreal Protocol on Substances That Deplete the Ozone Layer, and then the slightly safer trichloroethylene. Thinners currently used with correction fluid include bromopropane. Because it contains organic solvents (volatile organic compounds), unused correction fluid thickens over time as volatile solvents escape into the air. It can become too thick to use, and sometimes completely solidifies. Therefore, some manufacturers also sell bottles of solvent as "thinner", a few drops of which will return the correction fluid to its original liquid state. To avoid the inconveniences of organic solvents (safety and availability), some brands of fluid are water-based. However, those have the disadvantages of a longer drying time, and incompatibility with some inks (which soak through).

== Manufacture ==
Stainless steel tanks are used to hold 3,000 US gallons (11,000 L; 2,500 imp gal) or more. Specialists must consider the mixer and temperature control system carefully, and also the formula instructions, the correct types, and the amounts of raw materials at specified times by using computer controls. This process consists of 3 methods: firstly, compounding the batch; secondly, quality control check; and thirdly, filling and packing.

In the first phase, water is filled into the main batch tank. The suspending agents and some of the ingredients are added in this phase. Mixing is implemented at low rate for adequate dispersion. During mixing no air is added. In the second phase, a suitable amount of pigment is added into the water. Mixing is implemented at a very high rate in this process, which is different from the first phase. In the mixing process, when the particles are small enough, it will be added into the main batch. In the final phase, the resin and other necessary ingredients such as colorants and preservatives are added.

Physical and chemical characteristics such as pH, viscosity, appearance and odor are checked for quality. If there is an insufficient amount of some ingredients, more is added. When this process is finished, the correction fluid is pumped into a holding tank.

The filling process depends on the package used. In the filling line, filling heads inject fluid into each bottle. When filling is finished, the filled bottles are moved to the capping machine, and the bottles are boxed for shipping.

== Marketing ==
Correction fluid is commonly referred to by the leading brand names as genericized. These brands include:

- Cello (Correct-X)
- Kores
- Liquid Paper
- Presto! by Pentel
- Snopake
- Twink (New Zealand, a retired brand of Paper Mate popular in the 1980s-early 2000s)
- Tipp-Ex
- Wite-Out

== Health issues ==
Organic solvents are psychoactive when sufficient amounts are inhaled. Such solvents are commonly abused as inhalants by adolescents, partly because they are cheaper than other recreational drugs. Use of correction fluid as an inhalant can cause the heart to beat rapidly and irregularly, which can cause death. An unpleasant smell is added to some brands to deter abusers.

Companies have worked closely with authorities in order to ensure that all required warnings of the risks associated with inhaling or drinking the fluid are printed on packaging (card and product labels).

India has banned the retail sale of bottled nail polish remover and bottled correction fluid, but permits its sale in devices that provide a small amount of the chemical in a container that dispenses it in a controlled way. The Ministry of Education also banned its use in schools in 2017. The manufacturer is required to put health warnings on the packaging.

== See also ==
- Correction paper
- Correction tape
