= Electrical system design =

Design of electrical systems

Electrical system design is the design of electrical systems. This can be as simple as a flashlight cell connected through two wires to a light bulb or as involved as the Space Shuttle. Electrical systems are groups of electrical components connected to carry out some operation. Often the systems are combined with other systems. They might be subsystems of larger systems and have subsystems of their own. For example, a subway rapid transit electrical system is composed of the wayside electrical power supply, wayside control system, and the electrical systems of each transit car. Each transit car’s electrical system is a subsystem of the subway system. Inside of each transit car there are also subsystems, such as the car climate control system.

== Design ==
The following would be appropriate for the design of a moderate to large electrical system.

1. A specification document is written. It probably would have been written by the customer. The specification document states in plain language and numerical detail what the customer expects. If it is well written, it will be used as a reference throughout the electrical system design.
2. A functional specification (design) document that goes into more technical details may be created. It uses the specification document as its basis. Here calculations may be used or referenced to support design decisions.
3. Functional diagrams may be made. These use block diagrams indicating information and electrical power flow from component to component. They are similar to the functional flow block diagrams used with computer programs.
4. Schematic diagrams showing the electrical interconnections between the components are made. They may not show all the conductors and termination points. Except for one-line diagrams, this should show all the circuit nodes. One-line diagrams represent the three or four conductors of three-phase power circuits with one line.
5. Wiring diagrams are sometimes made. These show and name the termination points and names of each conductor. In some systems, enough information can be put onto the schematics so that wiring diagrams are not needed.
6. Physically smaller systems that are built many times may use a cable harness. A full-sized to-scale wiring diagram can be made of a cable harness. This wiring diagram can then be laid on a peg board and used to guide the construction of more cable harnesses. Harnesses can be inserted into their equipment as an assembly. Cable harnesses that are reused many times, like automobile wiring harnesses, are created with automated machinery.
7. A wire list is made in spreadsheet or list format. It shows the electrical assembly people what wires are to be connected and to where. When it is printed out on paper, it is easy for the assembly people to check off conductors as they are connected. The wire list contains at a minimum each wire name, terminal name, and wire model number or gage. It may also contain the wire termination device model numbers, voltage classes, conductor class (high-voltage, medium voltage, or control wiring), etc.
