= Plumbing drawing =

Type of technical drawing

A plumbing drawing, a type of technical drawing, shows the system of piping for fresh water going into the building and waste going out, both solid and liquid.

It also includes fuel gas drawings. Mainly plumbing drawing consist of water supply system drawings, drainage system drawings, irrigation system drawings, storm water system drawings. In water supply system drawing there will be hot water piping and cold water piping and hot water return piping also. In drainage system drawings there will be waste piping, Soil piping and vent piping. The set of drawing of each system like water supply, drainage etc is consist of Plans, Riser diagram, Installation details, Legends, Notes.

Every pipes should me marked with pipe sizes. If the drawing is detailed, fixture units also should be marked along with the pipe. In the realm of shop drawings, additional clarity is achieved by incorporating sections that reveal the intersection points of various pipes. These sections serve as visual guides, ensuring that the intricate network of pipes is comprehensively depicted. In shop drawings pipe sizes should be marked with the text and size should be shown with double line. Each pipes with different purposes will be displayed with different colors for ease of understanding. Drainage pipes should be shown with slope. For water supply, pump capacity and number of pumps will be attached as drawing file. For drainage, manhole schedule which consist of each manhole name, Invert level, Cover level, Depth are also attached as drawing file.

== See also ==
- Architectural drawing
- Electrical drawing
- Engineering drawing
- Mechanical systems drawing
- Structural drawing
- Working drawing
