= Electric bus (disambiguation) =

Electric bus is a bus powered by electric energy. "Electric bus" can also refer to:

- Bus (computing), used for connecting components of a computer or communication between computers
- Busbars, thick conductors used in electrical substations
  - In power engineering, a "bus" is any graph node of the single-line diagram at which voltage, current, power flow, or other quantities are to be evaluated. This may correspond to the physical busbars in substation.
  - A ground bus or earth bus is a conductor used as a zero voltage reference in a system, often connected to ground or earth.
- In professional audio, bus refers to a place in the audio signal chain where one can hear a mix of different audio signals—usually at the output of a mixing console.
