= Civil drawing =

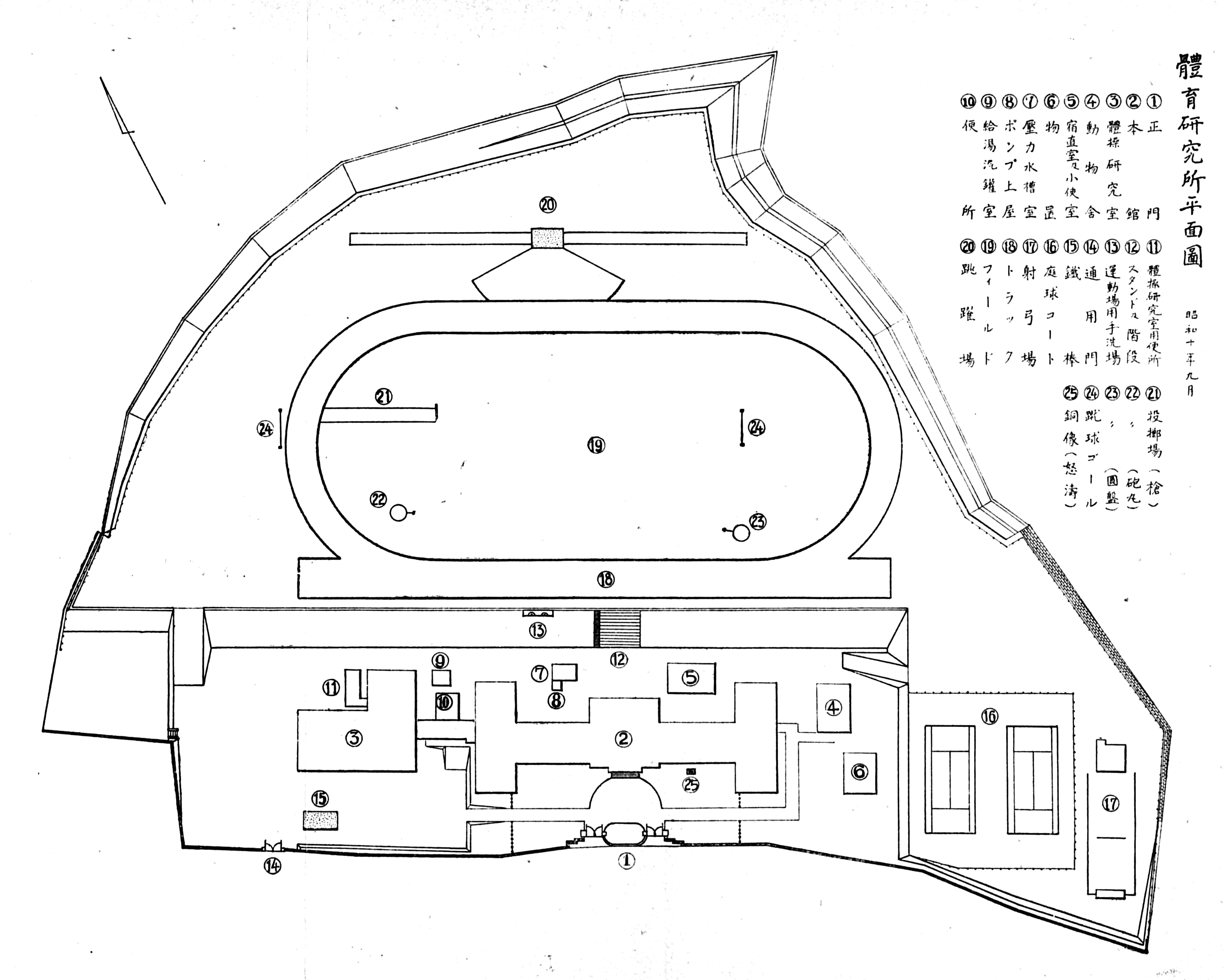
Site Drawing for Gov. Inst. for Research in Physical Education, Japan 1935.

A civil drawing, or site drawing, is a type of technical drawing that shows information about grading, landscaping, or other site details. These drawings are intended to give a clear picture of all things in a construction site to a civil engineer.

Civil drafters work with civil engineers and other industry professionals to prepare models and drawings for civil engineering projects. Examples of civil engineering projects are bridges, building sites, canals, dams, harbors, roadways, railroads, pipelines, public utility systems, and waterworks. Civil drafters create maps, plans, cross sections, profiles, and detail drawings.

== Process ==
The very early stages of a civil drawing start with surveying. Surveyors provide a map file of the job site from which civil designers and drafters develop drawings. After the surveying, other departments in the engineering firm start to work on other things such as draining, grading, foundation, and site preparation. Other projects such as electrical, piping, and sewage treatment might require another type of engineering or a specialized design. Final stages of a project may involve finished site preparation and landscape design. This aspect of a project may be contracted to landscape architects.

== Standards ==
Floor plans for Queensland Stock Institute Building

There are different sets of standards for each company, client, government, or professional organizations. For example, the Pakistan Society of Mechanical Engineers (PSME) standards might not be the same standards that a client has. But there are also some standards that can be used in any field such as ASME Y14.2 Line Conventions and Lettering. Companies often times use standards that published by a professional organization but will add their own standards. Some examples of these standards can be having a different method of saving CADD data or plotting procedures. Government standards are city, county, or federal codes. These standards must always be followed even if the company or professional organization standards are available. Government standards apply even when the government is not the client. Project Standards are the final documents that are used when designing and building a project. These standards can include a combination of different standards from a company, client, or government. Before the drawings get released for bids or construction permitting they must get checked to see if they have all the appropriate standards, this is called standard checking. This process is usually done by a software.

For structural drawings, it is important to know the elements and key components that are involved with the subject. These elements include beams, columns, and trusses. Each of these elements are important because they are what provide support to the structures that will be put to life. With structural drawings, you will see foundation plans, framing plans, steel detailing, and concrete reinforcement drawings. The foundation plans give you information on what is required as far as foundation walls, footings, and pile foundations if needed. Foundation walls are created to help support the structure and to help prevent soil & moisture from entering underneath the building. It transfers the weight of the building to the footings to make the building stable. The footings help to lock the structure in place, keeping the building from settling. Pile foundations are used for taller buildings or when needing to go deeper into the earth to reach more solid ground. Long cylinders made of concrete or steel are driven into the ground at the depth required. Framing plans give you the details on where beams, columns, and floor joists would be needed, while the steel detailing would give you the requirements for any steel beams and columns.

With Mechanical, Electrical, Plumbing and Fire Protection drawings you are provided with details on the specific needs of the structure such as heating and cooling, electrical wiring and plumbing, all while making sure the property is safe. The mechanical drawings show where your HVAC system will be located as well as all of the ductwork needed to heat and cool the building, while the electrical drawings show where your wiring, lighting and switches will be in each room. The plumbing drawings will show you the layout for the pipes, fixtures and any points that connect these. Your fire protection maps your fire alarm system, fire hydrants, and sprinkler systems to keep the building safe in an emergency.

Architectural drawings are also an important step because they provide floor plans, elevations, and sections for constructing the building. The floor plans detail the layouts of the rooms, walls, doors and windows along with the dimensions needed for each. Elevations show the exterior of the building from each angle, providing a look at the dimensions of the building, windows and doors, as well as the materials used to trim the structure. Sections give you an interior view of the walls, floors, stairs and ceilings, along with the heights and widths of these details.

Site plans are crucial to showing the property boundaries and dimensions. They detail any setbacks or easements required by the local and state building codes. Site plans also outline any existing buildings and roads on the property, as well as the utilities on site. Having all of this information helps with future planning and construction on the property. Safety is also an important aspect of civil engineering drawing. Civil engineers make sure that every detail in these drawings is accurate and that they comply with the local and state building codes and standards. These drawings are critical to reducing the risks of structural failure and keeping the public safe. Importance

Civil engineering drawings apply to infrastructure such as roads, highways, bridges, dams, and buildings. Civil engineers create plans intended to facilitate project accuracy and safety.

== See also ==
- Architectural drawing
- Site plan
- Structural drawing
- Working drawing
