= Electrical drawing =

Technical drawing in engineering

An electrical drawing is a type of technical drawing that shows information about power, lighting, and communication for an engineering or architectural project. Any electrical working drawing consists of "lines, symbols, dimensions, and notations to accurately convey an engineering's design to the workers, who install the electrical system on the job".

A complete set of working drawings for the average electrical system in large projects usually consists of:

- A plot plan showing the building's location and outside electrical wiring
- Floor plans showing the location of electrical systems on every floor
- Power-riser diagrams showing panel boards.
- Single-line diagrams
- General arrangement diagrams
- Control wiring diagrams
- Schedules and other information in combination with construction drawings.

Electrical drafters prepare wiring and layout diagrams used by workers who erect, install, and repair electrical equipment and wiring in communication centers, power plants, electrical distribution systems, and buildings.

== See also ==
- One-line diagram
- Architectural drawing
- Electronic schematic
- Engineering drawing
- Mechanical drawing
- Structural drawing
- Working drawing
