= Plan (drawing) =

Drawings or diagrams used to describe an object

Three view plan of Latécoère 28 for presentation purpose

Plans are a set of drawings or two-dimensional diagrams used to describe a place or object, or to communicate building or fabrication instructions. Usually plans are drawn or printed on paper, but they can take the form of a digital file.

Plans are used in a range of fields: architecture, urban planning, landscape architecture, mechanical engineering, civil engineering, industrial engineering to systems engineering.

The term "plan" may casually be used to refer to a single view, sheet, or drawing in a set of plans. More specifically a plan view is an orthographic projection looking down on the object, such as in a floor plan.

== Overview ==
Plans are often for technical purposes such as architecture, engineering, or planning. Their purpose in these disciplines is to accurately and unambiguously capture all the geometric features of a site, building, product or component. Plans can also be for presentation or orientation purposes, and are often less detailed versions of the former. The end goal of plans is either to portray an existing place or object, or to convey enough information to allow a builder or manufacturer to realize a design.

The process of producing plans, and the skill of producing them, is often referred to as technical drawing. A working drawing is a type of technical drawing, which is part of the documentation needed to build an engineering product or architecture. Typically in architecture these could include civil drawings, architectural drawings, structural drawings, mechanical drawings, electrical drawings, and plumbing drawings. In engineering, these drawings show all necessary data to manufacture a given object, such as dimensions and angles.

== Plan features ==
=== Format ===
Plans are often prepared in a "set". The set includes all the information required for the purpose of the set, and may exclude views or projections which are unnecessary. A set of plans can be on standard office-sized paper or on large sheets. It can be stapled, folded or rolled as required. A set of plans can also take the form of a digital file in a proprietary format such as DWG or an exchange file format such as DXF or PDF.

Plans are often referred to as "blueprints" or "bluelines". However, the terms are rapidly becoming an anachronism, since these copying methods have mostly been superseded by reproduction processes that yield black or multicolour lines on white paper, or by electronic representations of information.

=== Scale ===
Plans are usually "scale drawings", meaning that the plans are drawn at a specific ratio relative to the actual size of the place or object. Various scales may be used for different drawings in a set. For example, a floor plan may be drawn at 1:48 (or 1/4"=1'-0") whereas a detailed view may be drawn at 1:24 (or 1/2"=1'-0"). Site plans are often drawn at 1" = 20' (1:240) or 1" = 30' (1:360).

In the metric system the ratios commonly are 1:5, 1:10, 1:20, 1:50, 1:100, 1:200, 1:500, 1:1000, 1:2000 and 1:5000

=== Views and projections ===
Symbols used to define whether a projection is either Third Angle (right) or First Angle (left)

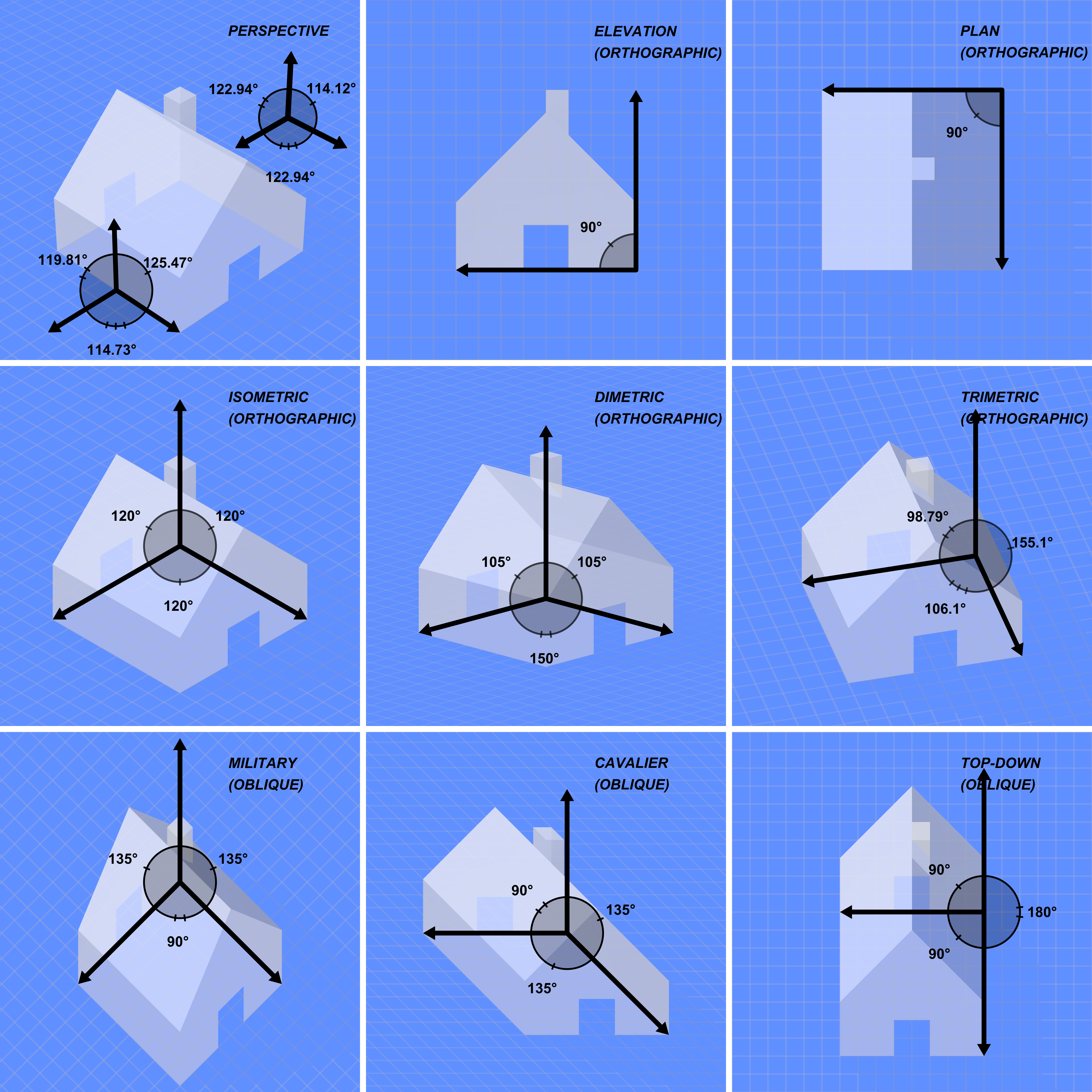
Comparison of several types of graphical projection

Because plans represent three-dimensional objects on a two-dimensional plane, the use of views or projections is crucial to the legibility of plans. Each projection is achieved by assuming a vantage point from which to see the place or object, and a type of projection. These projection types are:

Classification of Plan (drawing) and some 3D projections

- Parallel projection
  - Orthographic projection
    - Multiview projection, including:
      - Plan view or floor plan view
      - Elevation, usually a side view of an exterior
      - Section, a view of the interior at a particular cutting plane
    - Axonometric projection, including:
      - Isometric projection
      - Dimetric projection
      - Trimetric projection
  - Oblique projection, and
- Perspective projection, including:
  - One-point perspective
  - Two-point perspective
  - Three-point perspective

=== Planning approach ===
There is no universal standard for sheet order, however the following describes a common approach:

- General Information : The first sheets in a set may include notes, assembly descriptions, a rendering of the project, or simply the project title.
- Site : Site plans, including a key plan, appear before other plans and on smaller projects may be on the first sheet. A project could require a landscape plan, although this can be integrated with the site plan if the drawing remains clear.
- Specific plans : Floor plans, starting with the lowest floor and ending with the roof plan usually appear near the beginning of the set. Further, for example, reflected Ceiling Plans (RCP)s showing ceiling layouts appear after the floor plans.
- Elevations : Starting with the principal, or front elevation, all the building elevations appear after the plans. Smaller residential projects may display the elevations before the plans. Elevation details may appear on the same sheets as the building elevations.
- Sections: Building sections that describe views cut through the entire building appear next, followed by wall sections, then detail sections.
- Details: Details may appear on any of the previous sheets, or may be collected to appear on detail sheets. These details may include construction details that show how the components of the building fit together. These details may also include millwork drawings or other interior details.
- Schedules: Many aspects of a building must be listed as schedules on larger projects. These include schedules for windows, doors, wall or floor finishes, hardware, landscaping elements, rooms, and areas.

Where additional systems are complex and require many details for installation, specialized additional plan drawings may be used, such as:

- Structural: While smaller projects may only show structural information on the plans and sections, larger projects have separate sheets describing the structure of the building.
- Mechanical: Mechanical drawings show plumbing, heating, ventilation and air conditioning systems, or fire protection systems.
- Electrical :Electrical plan drawings may include equipment and cable tray layout, lighting and power, grounding, telephone, local area network, special communications or signal systems, or a reflected lighting plan.

== See also ==
- Architectural drawing
- Blueprint
- Engineering drawing
- Floor plan
- House plan
- Plat
