= Block diagram =

Graphical system analysis method

An example block diagram, showing the Microsoft Windows 2000 operating system architecture

A block diagram is a diagram of a system in which the principal parts or functions are represented by blocks connected by lines that show the relationships of the blocks. They are heavily used in engineering in hardware design, electronic design, software design, and process flow diagrams.

Block diagrams are typically used for higher level, less detailed descriptions that are intended to clarify overall concepts without concern for the details of implementation. Contrast this with the schematic diagrams and layout diagrams used in electrical engineering, which show the implementation details of electrical components and physical construction.

== Usage ==
As an example, a block diagram of a radio is not expected to show each and every connection and dial and switch, but the schematic diagram is. The schematic diagram of a radio does not show the width of each connection in the printed circuit board, but the layout does.

To make an analogy to the map making world, a block diagram is similar to a highway map of an entire nation. The major cities (functions) are listed but the minor connecting roads are not. When troubleshooting, this high level map is useful in narrowing down and identifying where the problem lies.

Block diagrams rely on the principle of the black box where the contents are hidden from view either to avoid being distracted by the details or because the details are not known. The inputs and outputs are known, however the process inside the box is not seen.

In electrical engineering, a design will often begin as a very high level block diagram, becoming more and more detailed block diagrams as the design progresses, finally ending in block diagrams detailed enough that each individual block can be easily implemented (at which point the block diagram is also a schematic diagram). This is known as top down design. Geometric shapes are often used in the diagram to aid interpretation and clarify meaning of the process or model. The geometric shapes are connected by lines to indicate association and direction/order of traversal. Each engineering discipline has their own meaning for each shape. Block diagrams are used in every discipline of engineering. They are also a valuable source of concept building and educationally beneficial in non-engineering disciplines.

In process control, block diagrams are a visual language for describing actions in a complex engineering system. The blocks serve as black boxes that represent mathematical or logical operations which occur in sequence from left to right and top to bottom. The physical entities, such as processors or relays, that perform those operations are not included. It is possible to create such block diagrams and implement their functionality with specialized programmable logic controller (PLC) programming languages as well as with online tools.

In biotechnology, block schemes are standard in the initial process design of bioconversion strategies. Biotech industries such as biofuel production, food processing, dairy processing and biopharma manufacturing utilize block diagrams. It helps in making the visualization of the overall bioprocess simpler and indicating recycling or control loops. There is some similarity between the block diagram and the Systems Biology Graphical Notation followed in bio-informatics. The block diagram technique is combined with control theory principles to represent extensive omics networks for systems biology approaches.

An example of this is the function block diagram, one of five programming languages defined in part 3 of the IEC 61131 (see IEC 61131-3) standard that is highly formalized (see formal system), with strict rules for how diagrams are to be built. Directed lines are used to connect input variables to block inputs, block outputs to output variables, and also block outputs as inputs of other blocks.

== See also ==
- Black box
- Bond graph
- Data flow diagram
- Functional flow block diagram
- One-line diagram
- Reliability block diagram
- Schematic diagram
- Signal-flow graph
