= Wiring diagram =

Simplified conventional pictorial representation of an electrical circuit

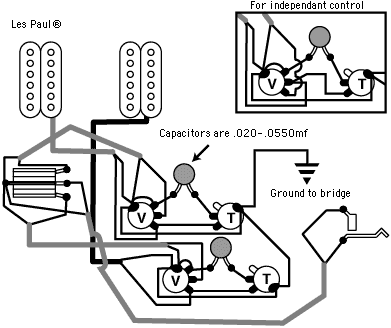
A wiring diagram for parts of an electric guitar, showing semi-pictorial representation of devices arranged in roughly the same locations they would have in the guitar.

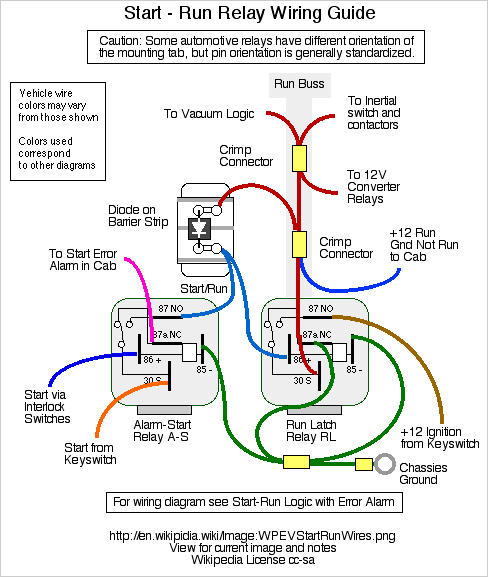
An automotive wiring diagram, showing useful information such as crimp connection locations and wire colors. These details may not be so easily found on a more schematic drawing.

A wiring diagram is a simplified conventional pictorial representation of an electrical circuit. It shows the components of the circuit as simplified shapes, and the power and signal connections between the devices.

A wiring diagram usually gives information about the relative position and arrangement of devices and terminals on the devices, to help in building or servicing the device. This is unlike a circuit diagram, or schematic diagram, where the arrangement of the components' interconnections on the diagram usually does not correspond to the components' physical locations in the finished device. A pictorial diagram would show more detail of the physical appearance, whereas a wiring diagram uses a more symbolic notation to emphasize interconnections over physical appearance.

A wiring diagram is often used to troubleshoot problems and to make sure that all the connections have been made and that everything is present.

== Architectural wiring diagrams ==
Architectural style wiring diagram, with lamps and switches shown symbolically in their physical locations on the plan view of the building.

Architectural wiring diagrams show the approximate locations and interconnections of receptacles, lighting, and permanent electrical services in a building. Interconnecting wire routes may be shown approximately, where particular receptacles or fixtures must be on a common circuit.

Wiring diagrams use standard symbols for wiring devices, usually different from those used on schematic diagrams. The electrical symbols not only show where something is to be installed, but also what type of device is being installed. For example, a surface ceiling light is shown by one symbol, a recessed ceiling light has a different symbol, and a surface fluorescent light has another symbol. Each type of switch has a different symbol and so do the various outlets. There are symbols that show the location of smoke detectors, the doorbell chime, and thermostat. On large projects symbols may be numbered to show, for example, the panel board and circuit to which the device connects, and also to identify which of several types of fixture are to be installed at that location.

A set of wiring diagrams may be required by the electrical inspection authority to approve connection of the residence to the public electrical supply system.

Wiring diagrams will also include panel schedules for circuit breaker panelboards, and riser diagrams for special services such as fire alarm or closed-circuit television or other special services.

== See also ==
- Connectome
- Electrical drawing
- Electrical wiring
- Circuit diagram
- Schematic
