= Single-line diagram =

Simplest symbolic representation of an electric power system

A typical single-line diagram with annotated power flows. Red boxes represent circuit breakers, grey lines represent three-phase bus and interconnecting conductors, the orange circle represents an electric generator, the green spiral is an inductor, and the three overlapping blue circles represent a double-wound transformer with a tertiary winding.

In power engineering, a single-line diagram (SLD), also sometimes called one-line diagram, is the simplest symbolic representation of an electric power system. A single line in the diagram typically corresponds to more than one physical conductor: in a direct current system the line includes the supply and return paths, in a three-phase system the line represents all three phases (the conductors are both supply and return due to the nature of the alternating current circuits).

The single-line diagram has its largest application in power flow studies. Electrical elements such as circuit breakers, transformers, capacitors, bus bars, and conductors are shown by standardized schematic symbols. Instead of representing each of three phases with a separate line or terminal, only one conductor is represented.

It is a form of block diagram graphically depicting the paths for power flow between entities of the system. Elements on the diagram do not represent the physical size or location of the electrical equipment, but it is a common convention to organize the diagram with the same left-to-right, top-to-bottom sequence as the switchgear or other apparatus represented. A single-line diagram can also be used to show a high level view of conduit runs for a PLC control system.

== Buses ==
The lines in the single-line diagram connect nodes – points in the system that are "electrically distinct" (i.e., there is nonzero electrical impedance between them). For sufficiently large systems, these points represent physical busbars, so the diagram nodes are frequently called buses. A bus corresponds to a location where the power is either injected into the system (e.g., a generator) or consumed (an electrical load). A steady-state of each bus can be characterized by its voltage phasor; the system state is defined by a vector of voltage phasors for all the buses. In a physical system the state is calculated through power system state estimation, since the end of the 20th century this process involves direct simultaneous measurements (synchrophasor) using the phasor measurement units.

== Balanced systems ==
The theory of three-phase power systems tells us that as long as the loads on each of the three phases are balanced, the system is fully represented by (and thus calculations can be performed for) any single phase (so called per phase analysis). In power engineering, this assumption is often useful, and to consider all three phases requires more effort with very little potential advantage. An important and frequent exception is an asymmetric fault on only one or two phases of the system.

A single-line diagram is usually used along with other notational simplifications, such as the per-unit system.

A secondary advantage to using a single-line diagram is that the simpler diagram leaves more space for non-electrical, such as economic, information to be included.

== Unbalanced systems ==
When using the method of symmetrical components, separate single-line diagrams are made for each of the positive, negative and zero-sequence systems. This simplifies the analysis of unbalanced conditions of a polyphase system. Items that have different impedances for the different phase sequences are identified on the diagrams. For example, in general a generator will have different positive and negative sequence impedance, and certain transformer winding connections block zero-sequence currents. The unbalanced system can be resolved into three single line diagrams for each sequence, and interconnected to show how the unbalanced components add in each part of the system.

== See also ==
- Electrical drawing

== Sources ==
- Oliver, Kenneth G. (1991). "Single Wire Diagrams". Basic Industrial Electricity: A Training and Maintenance Manual. Industrial Press Inc. pp. 38–41. ISBN 978-0-8311-3006-0. OCLC 1000410657.
- Meier, Alexandra von (30 June 2006). Electric Power Systems: A Conceptual Introduction. John Wiley & Sons. p. 197. ISBN 978-0-470-03640-2. OCLC 1039149555.
