= Dotting pen =

Draftsman's and cartographer's instrument

Video of Dietzgen Model 932S (2018)

A dotting pen (in German: Punktirfeder, also Dotted-line pen, Odontograph) is a draftsman's and cartographer's instrument for drawing dotted, dashed and dash-dotted lines with ease.

== History ==
In 1875, German engineer and manufacturer Emil Oscar Richter, after practicing in watchmaking, invented the Universal-Punktirfeder, a mechanical tool which consisted of a metal plate handle, a set of interchangeable gears, and a linked ruling pen (ger. Reißeder), which moves up and down (via cam and ratchet mechanism) while the tool slides along a path on paper. The name is a combination of the German words "Punktir" (dotted line) and "Reißfeder" (ruling pen); such drawing tools are alternatively named Odontograph, same as a tool used to shape involute gear teeth.

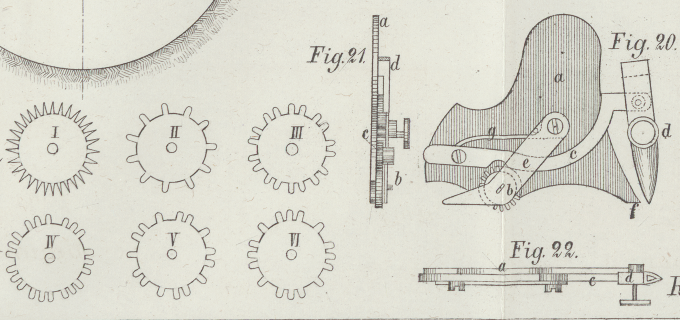
Punktirfeder (patent illustration)

E.O.Richter & Co. produced the tool as a separate item, but also included it in various sets of technical drawing tools along with the Kreig-Punktirfeder (a variant for attaching to a compass).

External images
- KERN-Reisszeug RA14 (K), Serie A
- Photo of the set
- List of 25 tools in the set
- Diploma from the International Youth Skills Olympics, 1978
- Article in the Berner Tagblatt newspaper (27 September 1978)

Richter's Universal-Punktirfeder

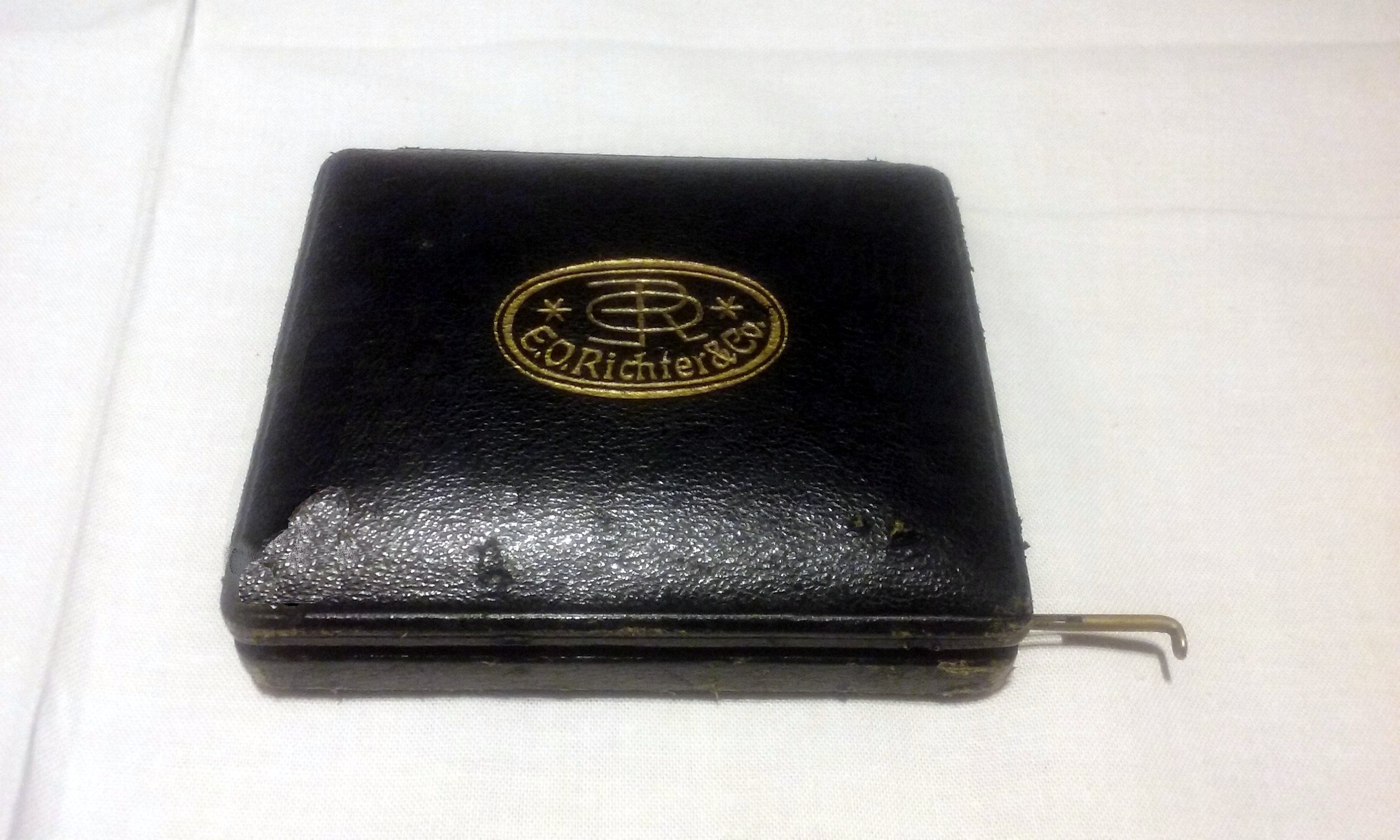
Original tool case

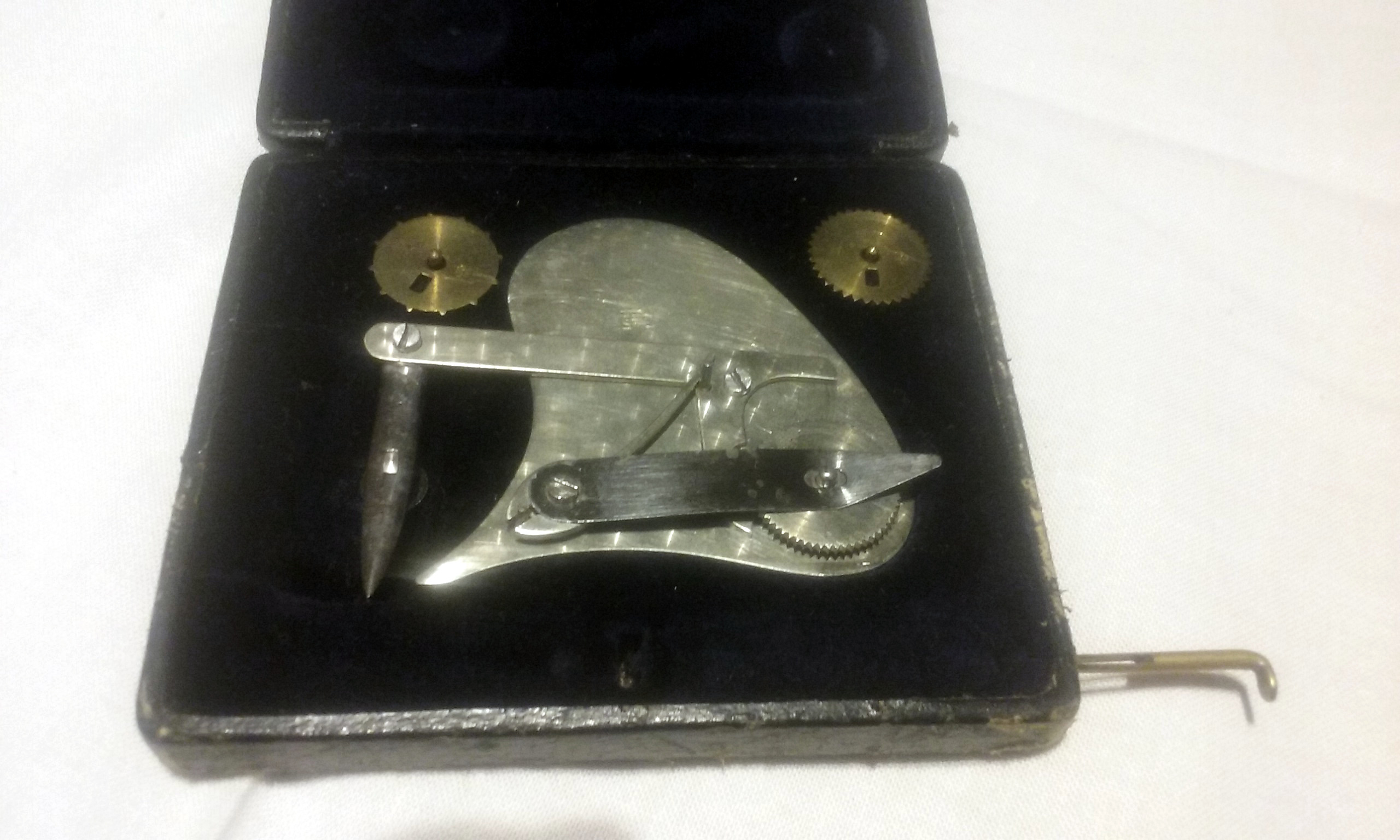
Tool with gears

Since 1905, after Richter's patent expired, other manufacturers produced almost identical tools:

- Eugene Dietzgen Co. has produced the Model 932S "Excello" since the 1920s (in 2018, an ASMR video depicting Dietzgen's 932S, published by David Grimes on YouTube, Reddit, and other social media, became viral).
- Soviet Plant «Gotovalnia» produced clones of Richter's sets, where the set №31 (1952) was one of both the Universal-Punktirfeder and the Kreig-Punktirfeder tools.
- KERN Aarau (aka KERN & Co., KERN Swiss) produced a tool indexed with 1069 as a separate item, but also included it in various sets, such as RA 342/343, A 164 and RA 14 (the last one used by a member of the Swiss Team who won the 4th place at the International Youth Skills Olympics, the WorldSkills Championship 1978 in South Korea).

Among other designs, there was the 551 Paragon dotting pen by Keuffel & Esser Co., which incorporated small gears into classic looking handy ruling pen.

== See also ==
- Road surface marking
- Ruling pen
- Rolling ruler
- Military protractor
- Orienteering compass
- Made in Germany
- Swiss made
- QCAD

== Sources ==
- Dotting Instruments. drawing-instruments.groups.io
- Planimètres, Compas, Instruments De Dessin by Daniel TOUSSAINT, 2019.
- Drawing Pens. mathsinstruments.me.uk
- Patent-Punktirfeder von E. O. Richter in Chemnitz // Dingler's Polytechnisches Journal, Band 218, Jahrgang 1875, S. 202. dingler.bbaw.de. «Der Uhrmacher E. O. Richter in Chemnitz, von dessen Patent-Nullenzirkel wir kürzlich (217 373) Abbildung und Beschreibung gaben, hat neuerdings (nach der deutschen Industriezeitung, 1875 S. 394) einen einfachen, sinnreichen Apparat construirt (Patent in Preußen und Sachsen), welcher für das technische Zeichnen sicher rasch ausgedehnte Verwendung finden wird. Jeder, der sich mit Projections- und Maschinenzeichnungen beschäftigt hat, weiß, wie zeitraubend und mühsam das Zeichnen der punktirten, der verschiedenen strichpunktirten und gestrichelten Linien ist.»
- Universal-Punktirfeder; Kreig-Punktirfeder // Catalog of E.O. Richter. (Chemnitz, Sachsen, Juni 1897), 6.
  - E.O. Richter. Tabellen. (1927)
  - Odontograph by Emil Oscar Richter, Germany, used at Sydney Observatory, Sydney, New South Wales, Australia, 1855–1900.
  - Dotted Line Pen. Archweb.
  - E O Richter. mathsinstruments.me.uk. «E O Richter (c1841-1907) founded the firm in Chemnitz, Saxony, after training as a clockmaker. In 1892 he patented his “flat system”, copied by many other makers after his patent ran out in 1905.»
  - Smithsonian Libraries, William Y. (1867). Priced and illustrated catalogue of mathematical instruments...Swiss drawing instruments, transits, levels. Philadelphia PA.
  - https://www.flickr.com/photos/185423305@N04/49131320623/
- Eugene Dietzgen Co. Dietzgen 932S Excello Dotting Instrument.
  - Eugene Dietzgen Co. Dotting Instrument.
  - Catalog of Eugene Dietzgen Co., 7th ed. (Chicago, 1904)
  - Harold B. Lee Library (1907). Catalogue & price list of Eugene Dietzgen Co. : manufacturers & importers of drawing materials & surveying instruments. Chicago : The company.
  - Technical Supply Company, Complete Catalog and Supply List, 5th ed. (Scranton, Pa., 1912)
  - Catalogue & price list of Eugene Dietzgen Co. (Chicago, 1910)
  - Catalog of Eugene Dietzgen Co., 12th ed. (Chicago, 1926)
- Keuffel & Esser 551 Paragon Dotting Pen. (1901-1936)
  - Catalogue of Keuffel & Esser Co., 21st ed. (New York, 1890)
  - Catalogue of Keuffel & Esser Co., 30th ed. (New York, 1899)
  - Catalogue and Price List of Keuffel & Esser Co., 32nd ed. (New York, 1906)
  - Catalogue and Price List of Keuffel & Esser Co., 33rd ed. (New York, 1909), 42, 46, 74.
  - Catalogue of Keuffel & Esser Co., 35th ed. (New York, 1915)
  - Catalogue and Price-List of Keuffel & Esser Co., 36th ed. (New York, 1921), 52, 70.
  - Catalogue of Keuffel & Esser Co., 37th ed. (New York, 1927)
  - Catalogue of Keuffel & Esser Co., 38th ed. (New York, 1936), 104, 127
- Готовальня №31. (Москва, Электрозаводск: Завод «Готовальня», 1952)
- Kern Dotting Pen. Kern Swiss, ca.1960. mathinstruments.ch
  - Instruction for use of Dotting Instrument. KERN Aarau: p.1, p.2.
  - Gebrauchsanleitung für den Punktierapparat 1069. Kern & Co. AG.
- Nineteenth Century Scientific Instruments and Their Makers, edited by PR de Clercq. (Holland, 1985)
- Maya Hambly, Drawing Instruments 1580:1980. (Sothebys, London, 1988), 29.
- Catalogues & Brochures. mathsinstruments.me.uk.
- Catalogues. kern-aarau.ch
