= Rotring =

Technical writing and drawing instruments company

- Formerly: Tintenkuli Handels GmbH (1928)
- Type: Private (1928–98); Subsidiary (1998–Present)
- Industry: Stationery
- Founded: 1928; 98 years ago
- Headquarters: Hamburg, Germany (closed)
- Area served: Worldwide
- Products: Technical pens, fountain pens, mechanical pencils, inks
- Owner: Newell Brands
- Parent: Sanford L.P.
- Website: rotring.com

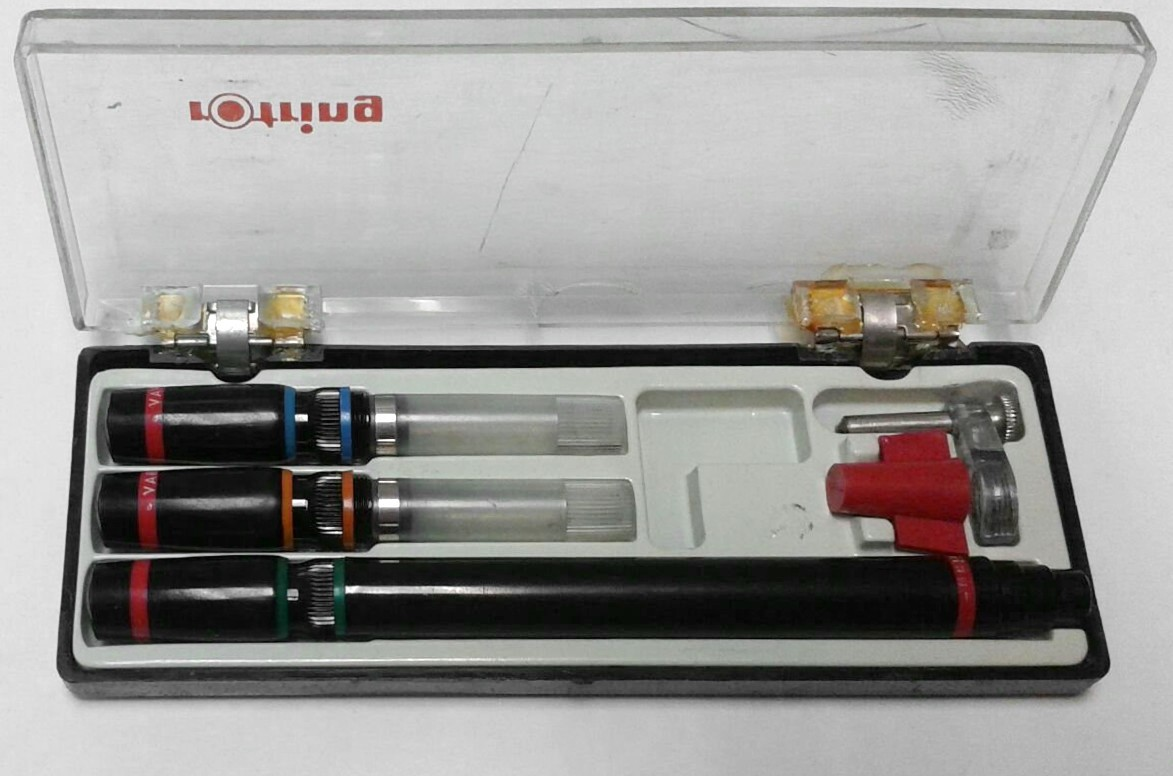
A box of technical pens

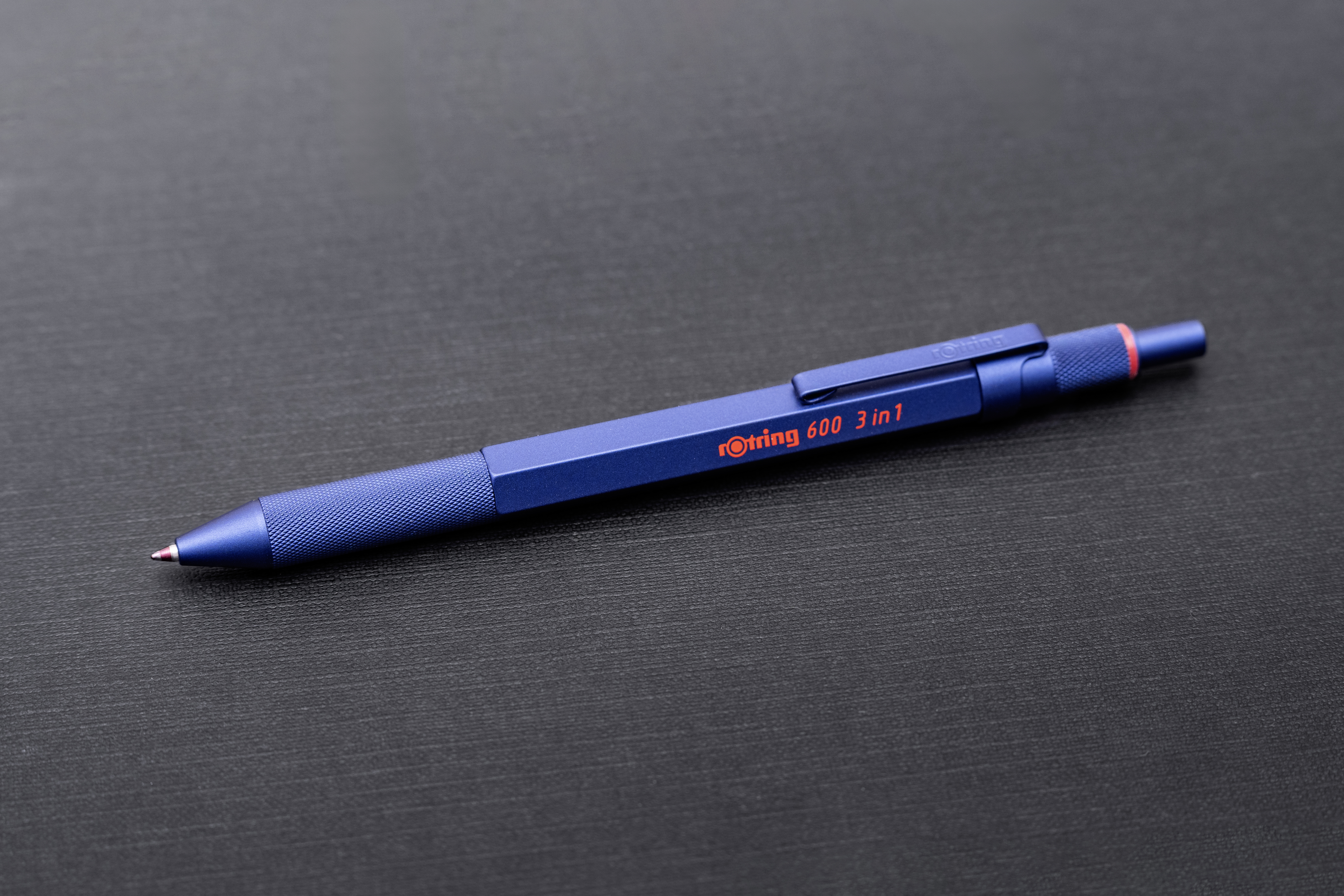
Rotring 600

Rotring (stylized rOtring) is a manufacturer of technical drawing tools and writing implements. Established in Germany in 1928 as a fountain pen manufacturer, Rotring went on to be acquired by Newell Brands in 1998. The name "Rotring" directly translates to "red ring", which refers to the company's signature: a red band placed around the barrel of the pen. The company's name was changed to Rotring in the early 1970s to match the trademark.

Since the Rotring factory and headquarters in Hamburg were shut down, production has been handled and distributed by Japanese manufacturer Holbein and other manufacturers.

== History ==
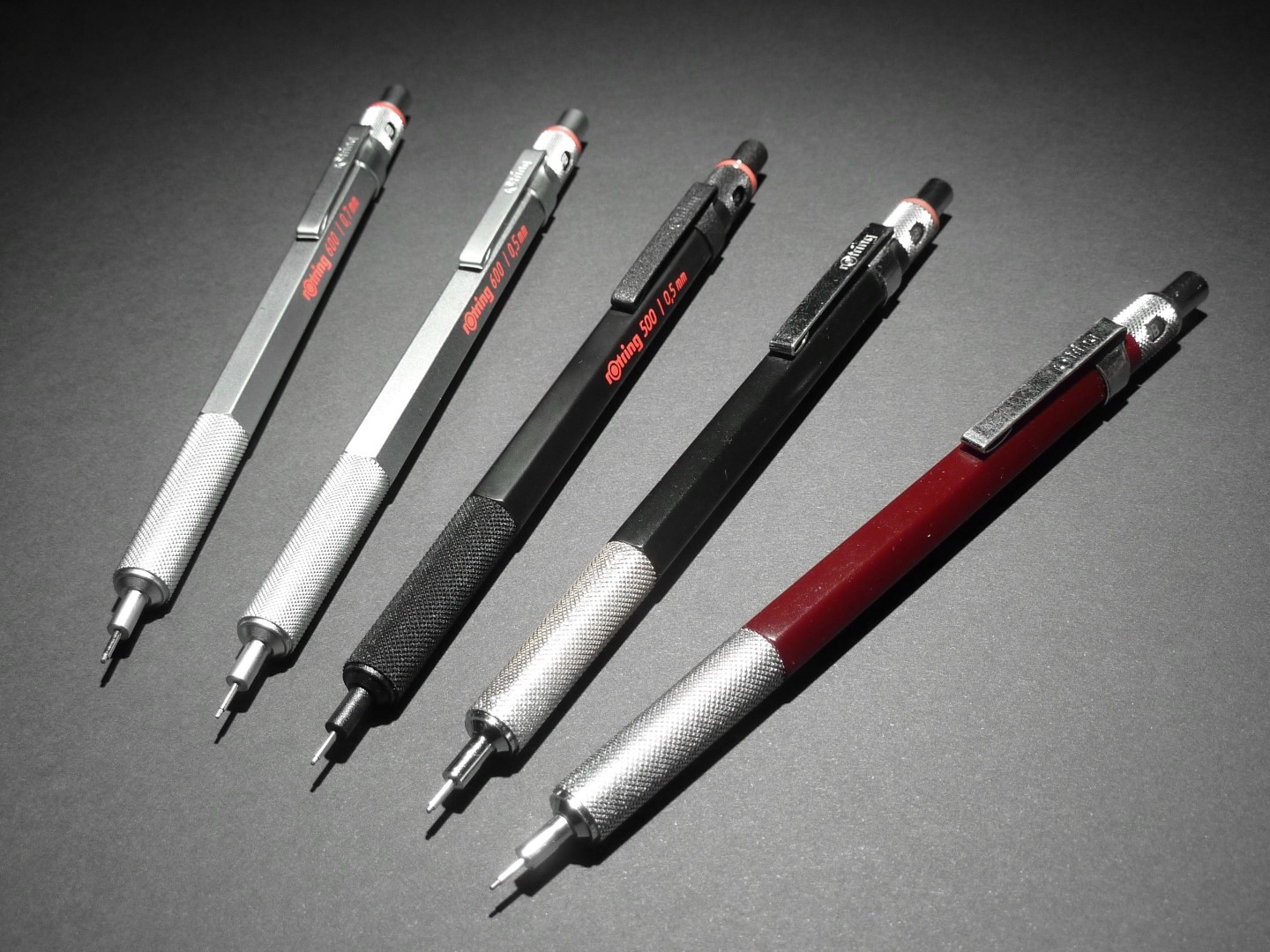
Rotring mechanical pencils

The company was established in 1928 as "Tintenkuli Handels GmbH". The company's first product was the "Tintenkuli", a type of pen with a narrow steel tube instead of a conventional nib. While fountain pens were already common in America, they had not been previously marketed in Europe.

In 1934, Rotring launched the "Multipen", a mechanical pencil that allowed the variation of colors, with four of them contained on each pencil. Although stylographs never overtook fountain pens for use in writing, by 1953 the Rotring "Rapidograph" model became the prototypical technical pen of its age, establishing the Rapidograph Inc. in the United States one year later. Its technology virtually replaced the ruling pen and greatly simplified technical drawing.

A second generation of technical pens, the "Variant" and "Varioscript" models, were launched in 1958, with commercial success. In 1967, the company introduced its first drawing set, that consisted of compass, technical pens, templates, inks, scale ruler and other tools. One year later, the "Micronorm" was added to the technical pens line. In 1971, Rotring acquired writing instrument manufacturer Adolf Waldmann KG of Pforzheim.

Rotring expanded operations, establishing branches in Europe and the United States, in 1974. The "Isograph" technical pen was launched in 1976. That same year Rotring launched its first drawing board, and the "Tikky" mechanical pencil was released in 1979. The "Art Pen", a fountain pen suitable for calligraphy, was launched in 1984. During the decade, Rotring set new subsidiaries in other European countries, while the "600" mechanical pencil was introduced in 1989. New releases came in 1995 with the "Xonox", a variation of the Tikky model in form of a marker pen with a needlepoint tip.

The advent in the 1990s of computer-aided design (CAD) saw the partial demise of the technical drawing pen. To combat this, Rotring diversified its range of graphic pens, pencils and markers.

In 1998 Rotring was taken over by Sanford, an American company specialising in graphic products and part of Newell Rubbermaid (currently, Newell Brands) since 1992.

During the first decade of the 2000s Rotring released some lines of fountain and ballpoint pens, the "Skynn" (2003) and the "Newton" (2005). In 2014, the brand introduced the "800+", a hybrid mechanical pencil that could be used on both mediums, paper and touchscreens. It was advertised with the slogan "Think on paper + Think on digital". The Rotring 600 ballpoint pen was re-introduced in 2018 alongside the Rotring 800 ballpoint, which was the re-release of the 600 Gold ballpoint pen.

== Products ==

Rotring "Rapidograph" (above) and "Isograph" (below), 0.35mm technical pens models

Brand	Range of Products
Rapidograph, Isograph	Technical pens, refill inks
Art Pen	Calligraphy fountain pens, refill inks
Rapid Pro	Mechanical pencils, leads
300, 400, 500, 600, 800, 800+	Drafting mechanical pencils
600, 800	Ballpoint Pens
Tikky	Ballpoint pens, markers, mechanical pencils, leads, refills, erasers
Precision	Compasses, geometry squares, lettering and circle stencils, protractors, rulers

=== Rapidograph and Isograph ===
Rotring's Rapidograph and Isograph are visually very similar. The primary difference between these models is the ink reservoir. Whereas the Isograph has a refillable reservoir, the Rapidograph can be loaded with disposable capillary ink cartridges (which are themselves capable of being refilled).

The Rapidograph nibs were manufactured in several versions:

- Rapidograph: They were manufactured "for drawing and lettering on tracing paper and line board".
- Rapidograph F: Rapidograph F nibs contain a hard metal tip. They were manufactured "for drawing and lettering on matt drafting film".
- Rapidograph J: Rapidograph J nibs contain a jewel tip. They were manufactured "for drawing and lettering on matt drawing film, tracing paper, and line-board" and were therefore more durable than the Rapidograph F nibs.

== See also ==
- Faber-Castell
- Staedtler
