= Technical drawing tool =

Tools and instruments used for accurate and precise manual drafting

Drafting tools may be used for measurement and layout of drawings, or to improve the consistency and speed of creation of standard drawing elements. Tools such as pens and pencils mark the drawing medium. Other tools such as straight edges, assist the operator in drawing straight lines, or assist the operator in drawing complicated shapes repeatedly. Various scales and the protractor are used to measure the lengths of lines and angles, allowing accurate scale drawing to be carried out. The compass is used to draw arcs and circles. A drawing board was used to hold the drawing media in place; later boards included drafting machines that sped the layout of straight lines and angles. Tools such as templates and lettering guides assisted in the drawing of repetitive elements such as circles, ellipses, schematic symbols and text. Other auxiliary tools were used for special drawing purposes or for functions related to the preparation and revision of drawings. The tools used for manual technical drawing have been displaced by the advent of computer-aided drawing, drafting and design (CADD).

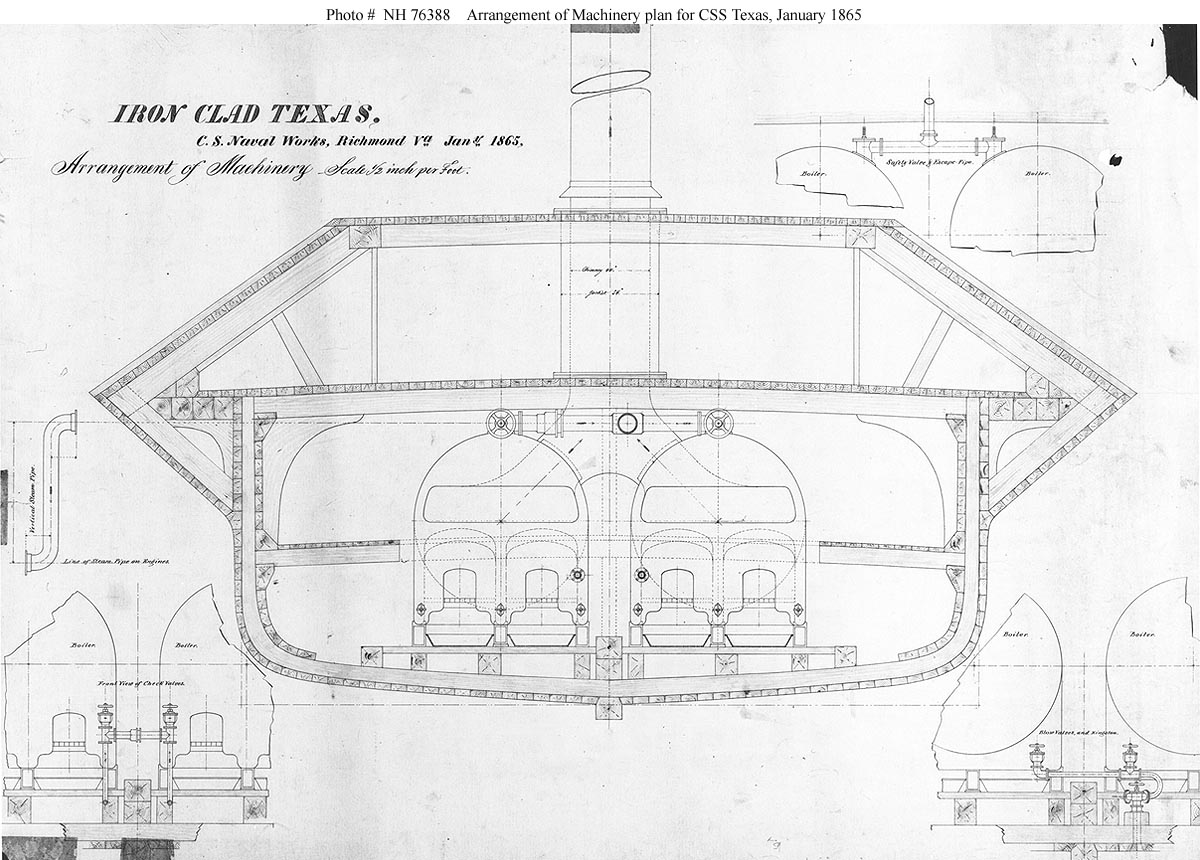
The ship's steam machinery installation drawing for the iron-clad CSS Texas, 1865

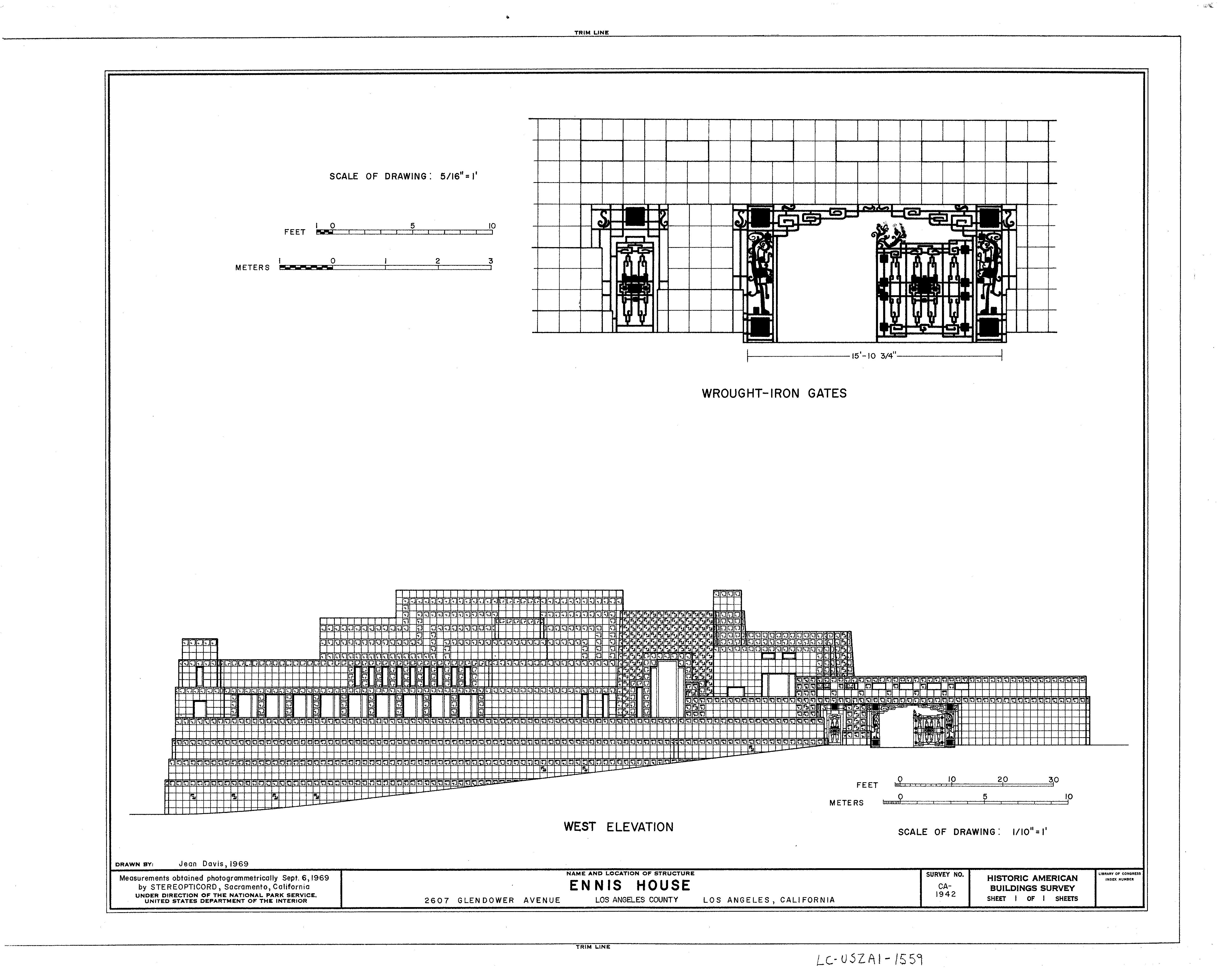
Hand drawing for the facade of Ennis House, 1969

== History ==
The ancient Egyptians are known to have used wooden corner rulers. Ancient Nuragic people in Sardinia used compasses made of bronze, like the one displayed in showcase 25 in the Nuragic department of the National Archeological Museum G. A. Sanna in Sassari. In ancient Greece, evidence has been found of the use of styli and metal chisels, scale rulers and triangle rulers. Excavations in Pompeii have found a bronze tool kit used by the Romans, which contained triangle rulers, compasses and a ruler to use with a pen.

Although a variety of styli were developed in ancient times and were still being used in the 18th century, quills were generally used as the main drawing tool. Styli were also used in the form of ivory or ebony pencils.

Protractors have been used to measure and draw angles and arcs of a circle accurately since about the 13th century, although mathematics and science demanded more detailed drawing instruments. The adjustable corner ruler was developed in the 17th century, but a feasible screw-tightened version not until the 1920s.

Holding a ruling-pen, 1901

In the 17th century, a stylus that could draw a line with a specific width called a ruling pen was developed. The stylus had two curved metal pieces which were joined by a screw. Ink was trickled between the blades, from which it flowed evenly across the paper. The basic model was maintained for a long time, with minor modifications, until the 1930s when the German technical drawing pens came to the market.

Artists (including Leonardo da Vinci and Albrecht Dürer, Nicholas Bion and George Adams) generally made drawing tools for themselves. Industrial production of technical drawing instruments started in 1853, when Englishman William Stanley (1829–1909) founded a technical manufacturing company in London. Even then, however, most tools were still made by hand.

In the 1930s the equipment available expanded: drawing apparatus and Rapidograph-drawing pens appeared, improving the line quality and, especially, producing consistent line width. In addition to the Rapidograph stylus, a more traditional Grafos-type stylus was used for a long time, where different line widths were achieved by changing the pen nib. For instance in Finland Grafos was commonly used as a primary drawing tool still in the early 1970s.

Equipment changed radically during the 1990s, when computer-aided design almost completely ousted drawing by hand. Technical design has changed from drawing by hand to producing computer-aided design drawings, where drawings are no longer "drawn", but are built from a virtually-produced model. Drawings are not necessarily produced in hard copy at all, and if they are needed they are printed automatically by a computer program. Hand-drawn designs however are still widely used in the draft design stage.

== Drawing tools ==
=== Pencil ===
Traditional and typical styli used for technical drawing are pencils and technical pens.

Video of a 1930s dotted-line drawing pen

Pencils in use are usually mechanical pencils with a standard lead thickness. The usual line widths are 0.35 mm, 0.5 mm, 0.7 mm and 1.0 mm. Hardness varies usually from HB to 2H. Softer lead gives a better contrast, but harder lead gives a more accurate line. Bad contrast of the lead line in general is problematic when photocopying, but new scanning copy techniques have improved the final result. Paper or plastic surfaces require their own lead types.

"Drawing pens"
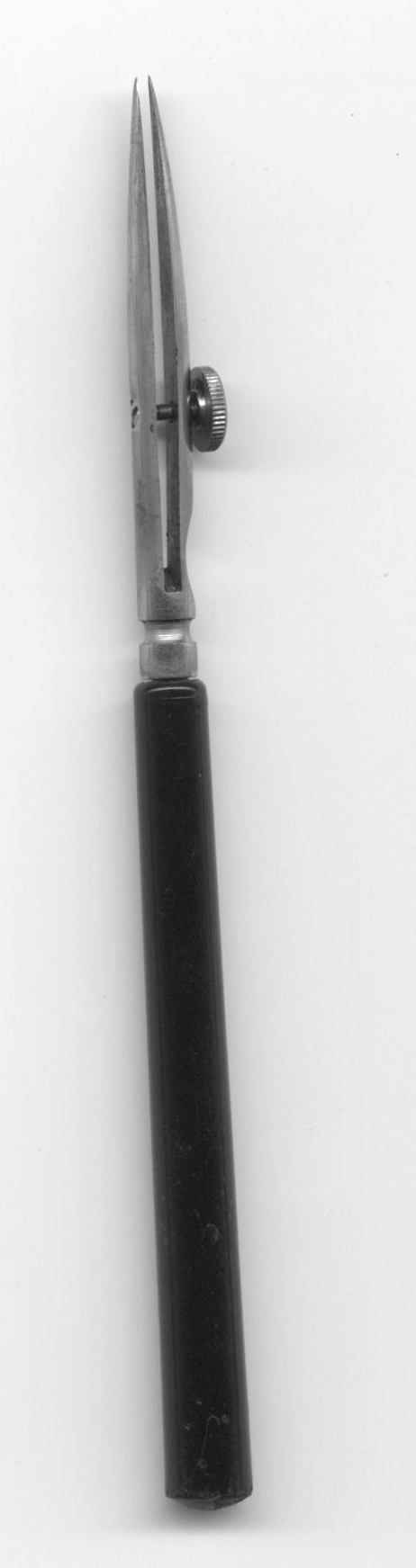
A traditional ruling pen, already in use in the 1600s.

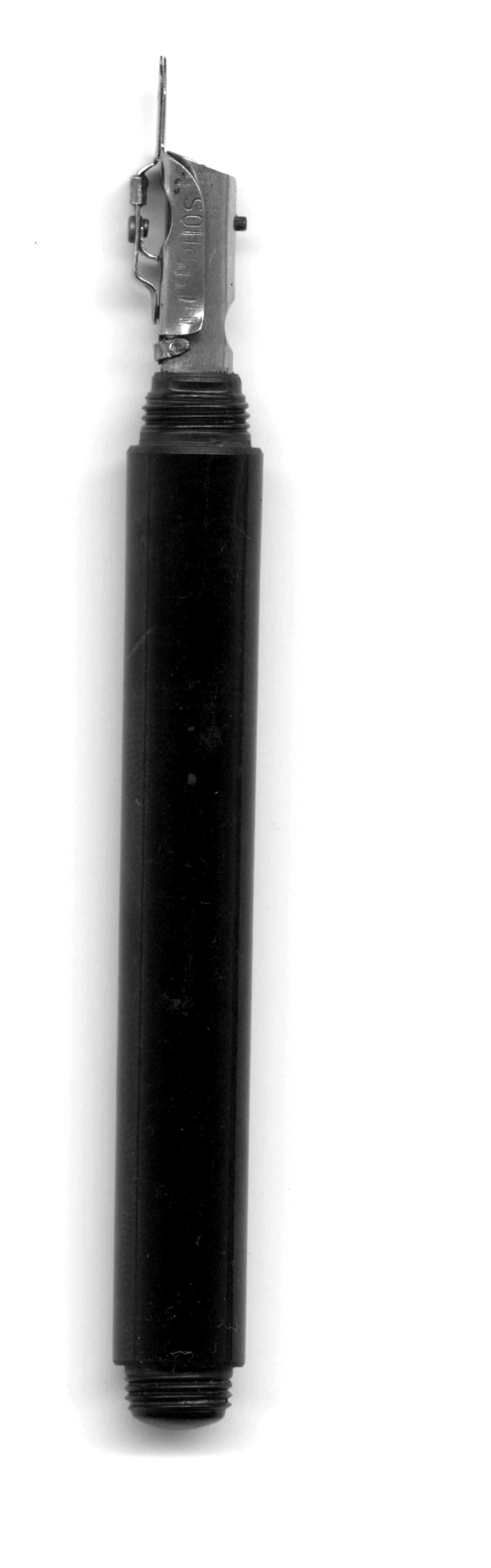
Grafos stylus.

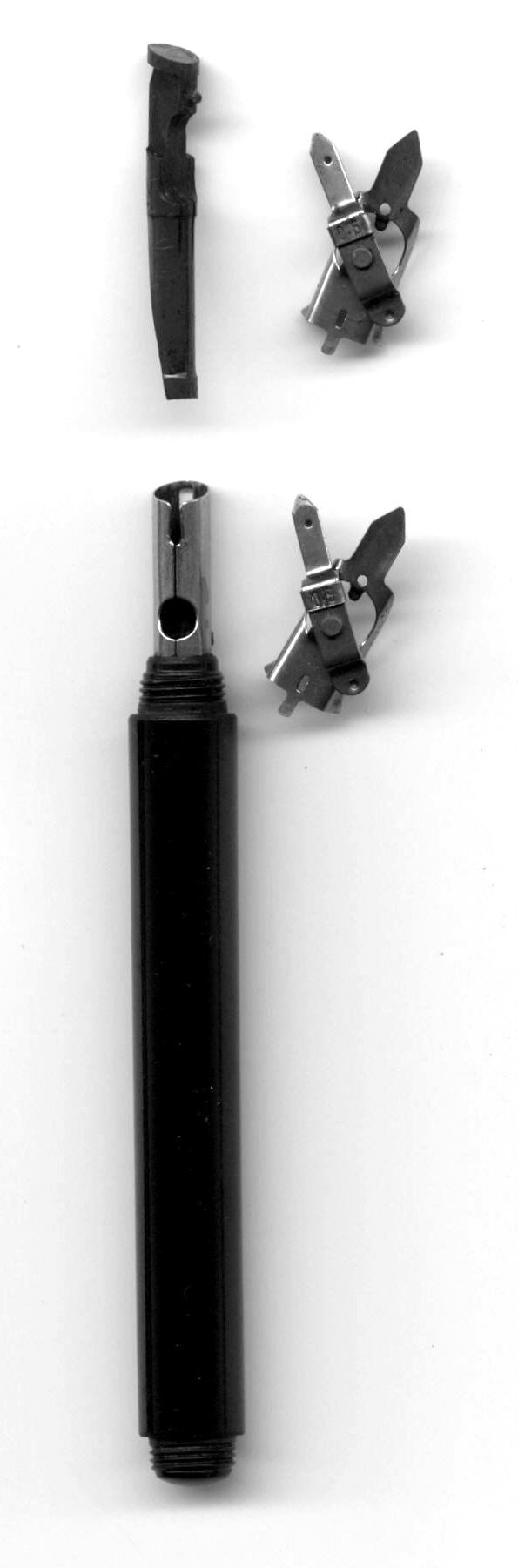
A disassembled Grafos and nibs of different widths.

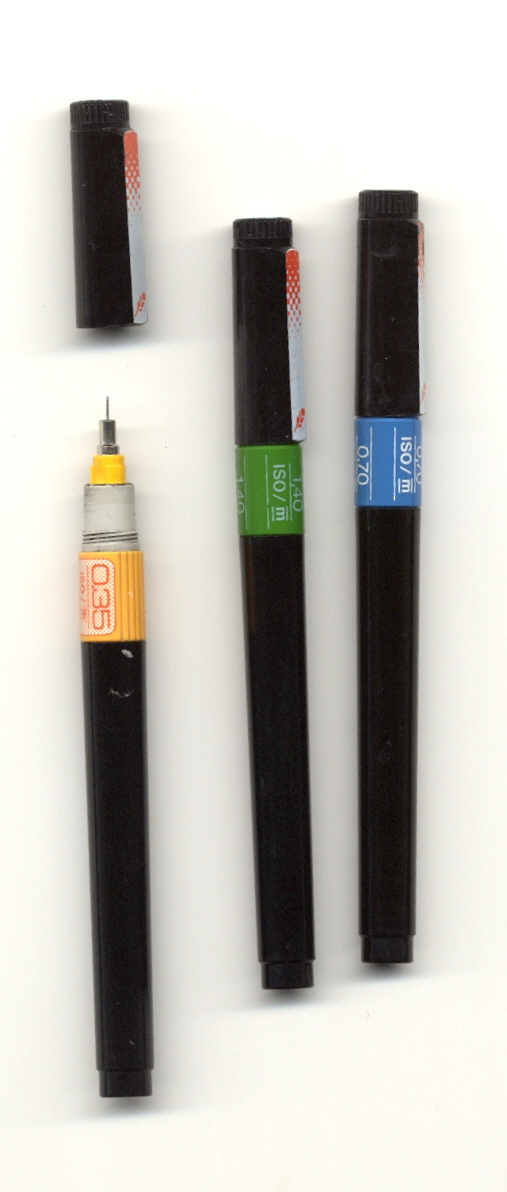
Rapidograph styli of different widths: 0.35, 1.4 and 0.7 mm.

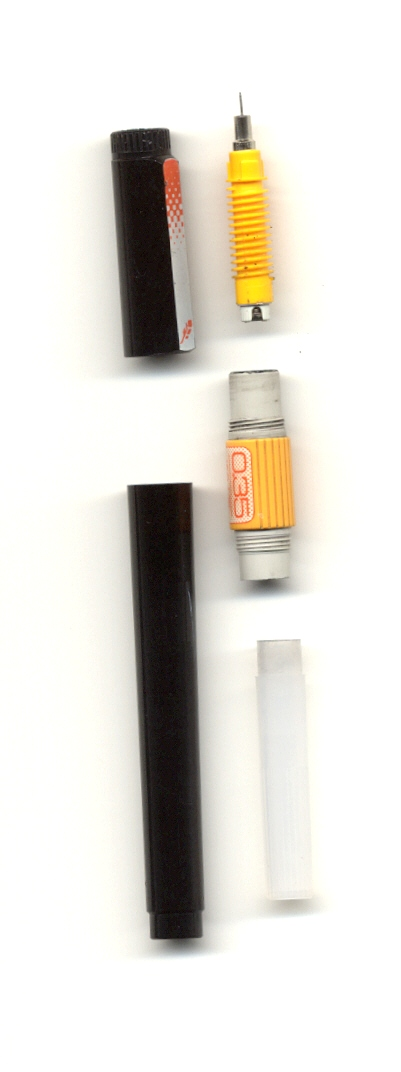
Rapidograph stylus parts. The head can be further disassembled.

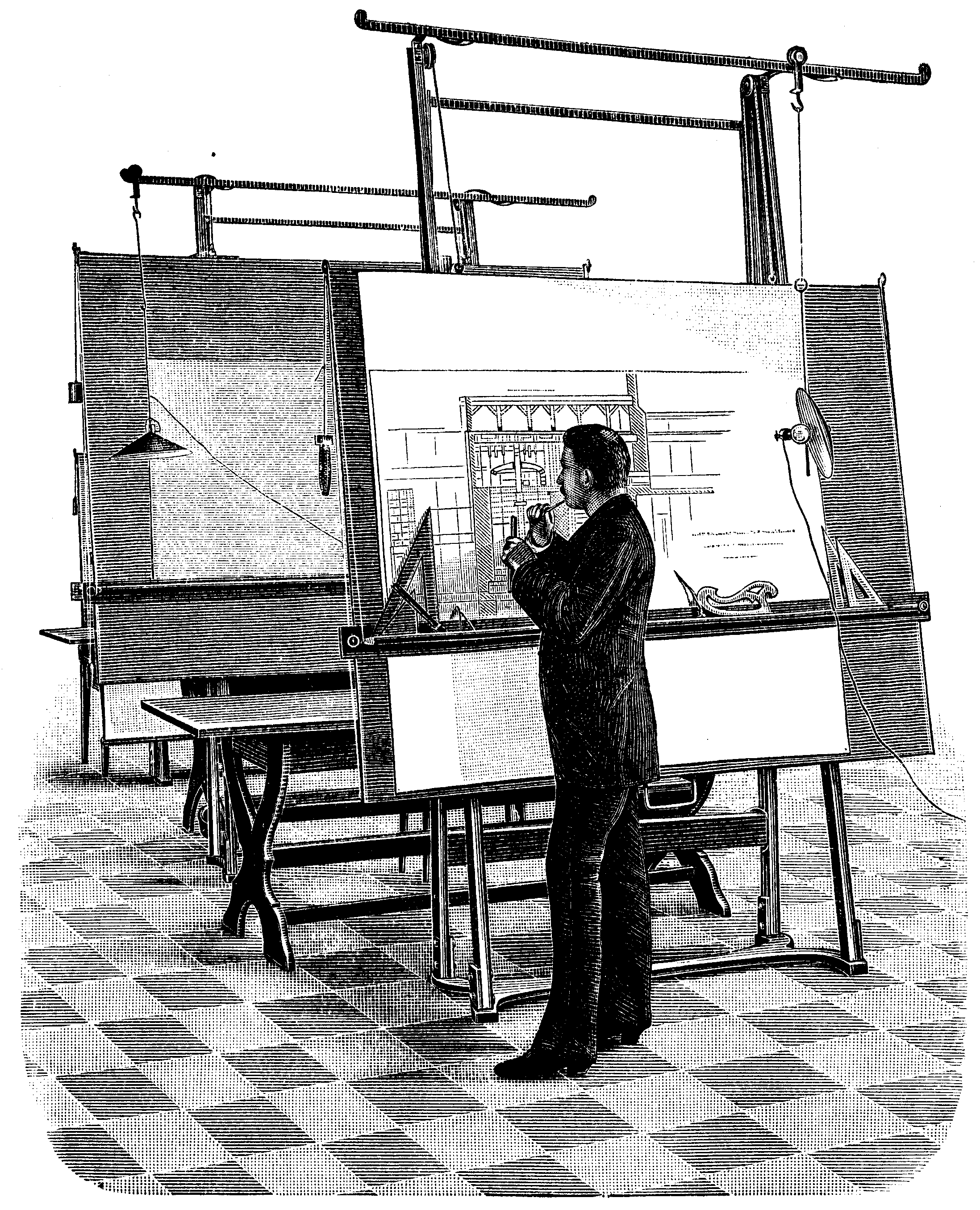
A parallel ruler-equipped drawing board. Drawing from an article published in a Norwegian technical journal Teknisk Ukeblad in 1893. The article dealt with a new kind of vertical drawing apparatus. The board was equipped with a lift mechanism, improving the ergonomy when doing large drawings.

In most cases, the final drawings are drawn with ink, on either plastic or tracing paper. The pen is generally a Rapidograph-type technical pen, a marker pen that draws lines of consistent width (so-called steel marker pen). The pen has an ink container which contains a metal tube, inside which is a thin metal needle or wire, the soul. Ink is absorbed between the needle and the tube wall, preventing an excessive amount of ink from being released. The needle has a weight and by waving the pen back and forth the needle is released and the ink can run. Originally, the tank was filled from an ink bottle; newer pens sometimes alternatively use ink cartridges.

Each line width has its own stylus. The line width is standardized: In Finland, the most commonly used set is 0.13 mm, 0.18 mm, 0.25 mm, 0.35 mm, 0.50 mm and 0.70 mm. Separate styli are used for tracing paper and plastic, because plastic requires a harder pen tip. To function well they require regular maintenance, the finest marker pens in particular.

=== Drafting board ===
The drawing board is an essential tool. Paper will be attached and kept straight and still, so that the drawing can be done with accuracy. Generally, different kind of assistance rulers are used in drawing. The drawing board is usually mounted to a floor pedestal in which the board turns to a different position, and also its height can be adjustable. Smaller drawing boards are produced for table-top use. In the 18th and 19th centuries, drawing paper was dampened and then its edges glued to the drawing board. After drying the paper would be flat and smooth. The completed drawing was then cut free. Paper could also be secured to the drawing board with drawing pins or even C-clamps. More recent practice is to use self-adhesive drafting tape to secure paper to the board, including the sophisticated use of individualized adhesive dots from a dispensing roll. Some drawing boards are magnetized, allowing paper to be held down by long steel strips. Boards used for overlay drafting or animation may include registration pins or peg bars to ensure alignment of multiple layers of drawing media.

=== T-square ===
A T-square is a straightedge which uses the edge of the drawing board as a support. It is used with the drafting board to draw horizontal lines and to align other drawing instruments. Wooden, metal, or plastic triangles with 30° and 60° angles or with two 45° angles are used to speed drawing of lines at these commonly used angles. A continuously adjustable 0–90° protractor is also in use. An alternative to the T-square is the parallel bar which is permanently attached to the drawing board. It has a set of cables and pulleys to allow it to be positioned anywhere on the drawing surface while still remaining parallel to the bottom of the board. The drafting machine replaces the T-square and triangles.

=== Drafting machine ===
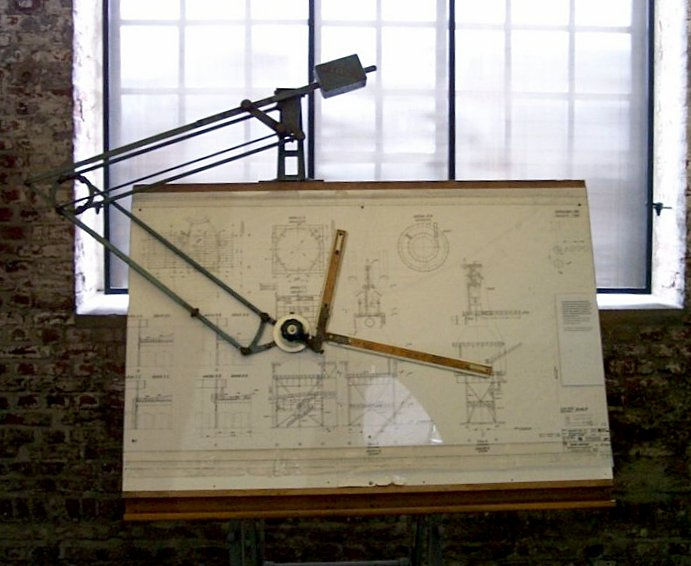
Right-handed parallelogram machine with a ballast.

A drafting machine is a device which is mounted to the drawing board. It has rulers whose angles can be precisely adjusted with a controlling mechanism. There are two main types of apparatus: an arm-type parallelogram apparatus based on a hinged arm; and a track-type apparatus which moves on a rail mounted to the top of the drawing board. The accuracy of the arm type apparatus is better in the middle of the board, decreasing towards the edges, whereas a track machine has a constant accuracy over the whole board. The drawing head of a track-type drafting machine slides on bearings in a vertical rail, which in turn is moved along a horizontal, top-mounted rail. Both apparatus types have an adjustable drawing-head with rules attached to a protractor scale so that the angle of the rules may be adjusted.

A drafting machine allows easy drawing of parallel lines over the paper. The adjustable angle between the rulers allows the lines to be drawn in varying accurate angles. Rulers may also be used as a support for separate special rulers and letter templates. The rules are replaceable and they can be for example scale-rules.

Drawing apparatus has evolved from a drawing board mounted parallel ruler and a pantograph, which is a device used for copying objects in an adjustable ratio of sizes.

=== French curves ===
French curves are made of wood, plastic or celluloid. Some set squares also have these curves cut in the middle. French curves are used for drawing curves which cannot be drawn with compasses. A faint freehand curve is first drawn through the known points; the longest possible curve that coincides exactly with the freehand curve is then found out from the French curves. Finally, a neat continuous curve is drawn with the aid of the French curves.

=== Rulers ===
Rulers used in technical drawing are usually made of polystyrene. It is used for drawing lines and connecting points. Rulers come in two types according to the design of their edge. A ruler with a straight edge can be used with lead pencils and felt pens, whereas when a technical pen is used the edge must be grooved to prevent the spread of the ink.

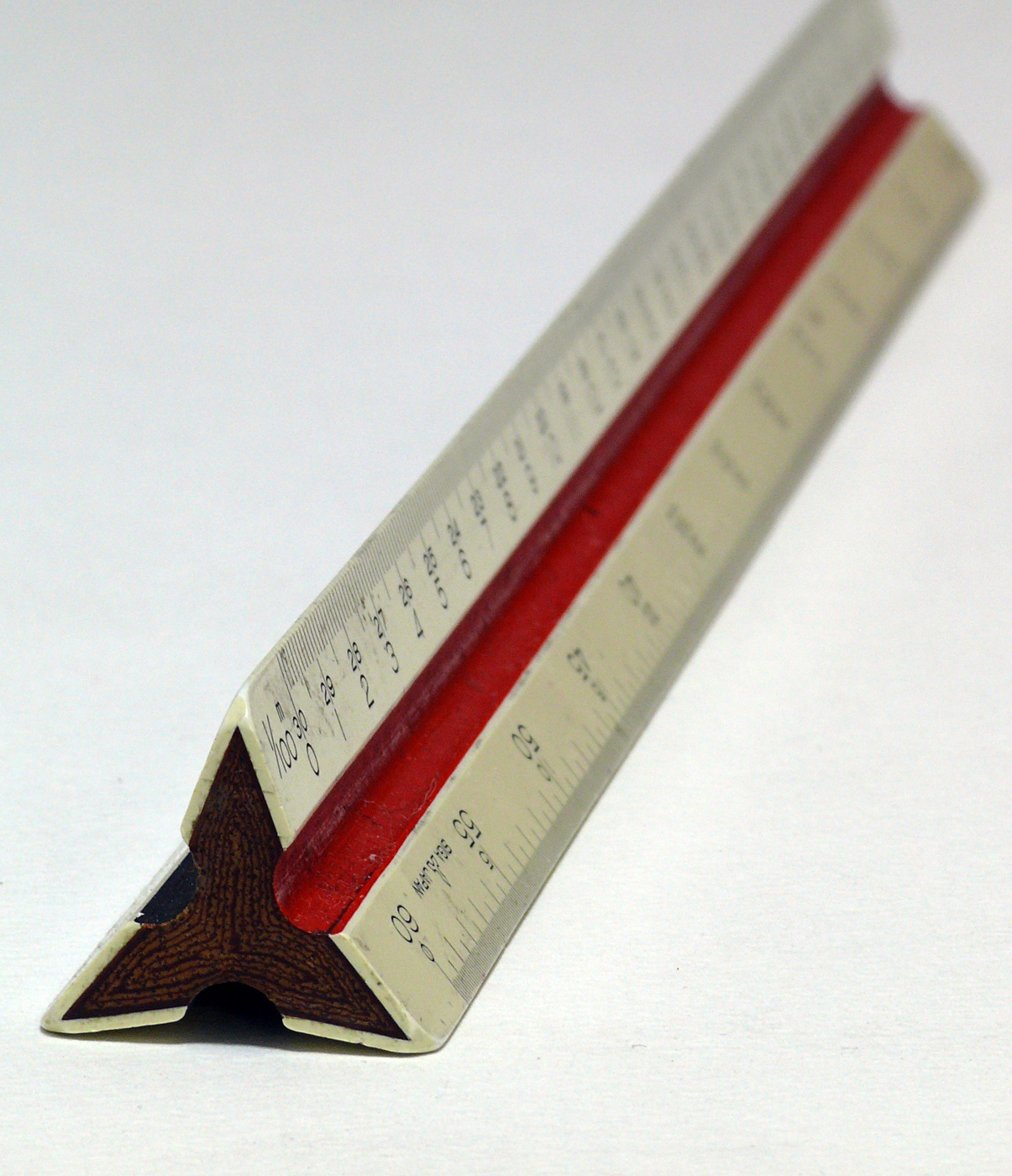
An architect's scale

A scale ruler is a scaled, three-edged ruler which has six different scales marked to its sides. A typical combination for building details is 1:20, 1:50, 1:100, 1:25, 1:75 and 1:125. There are separate rulers for zoning work as well as for inch units. Today scale rulers are made of plastic, formerly they were made of hardwood. A pocket-sized version is also available, with scales printed on flexible plastic strips.

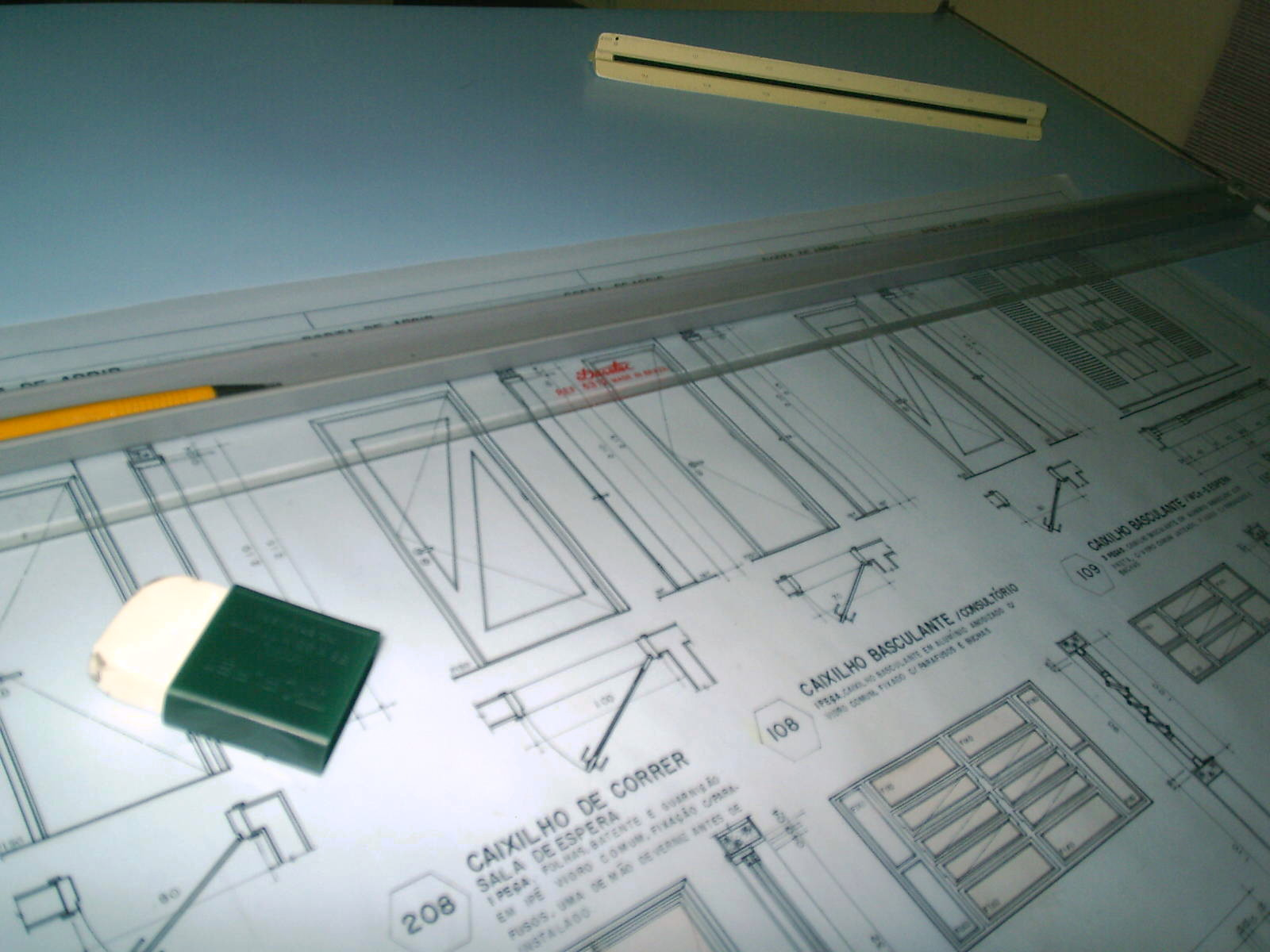
View of a drafting table: the old way of producing architectural and engineering drawings. On the top of the board is a parallel ruler.

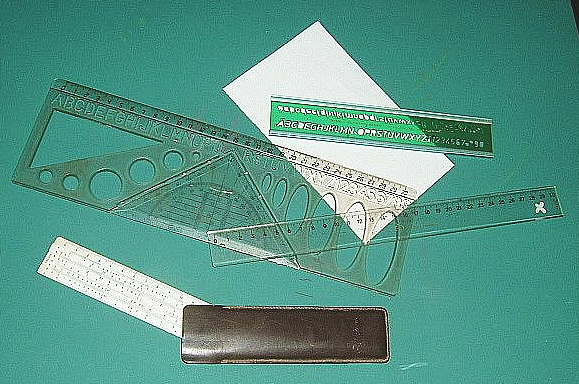
Rulers and templates

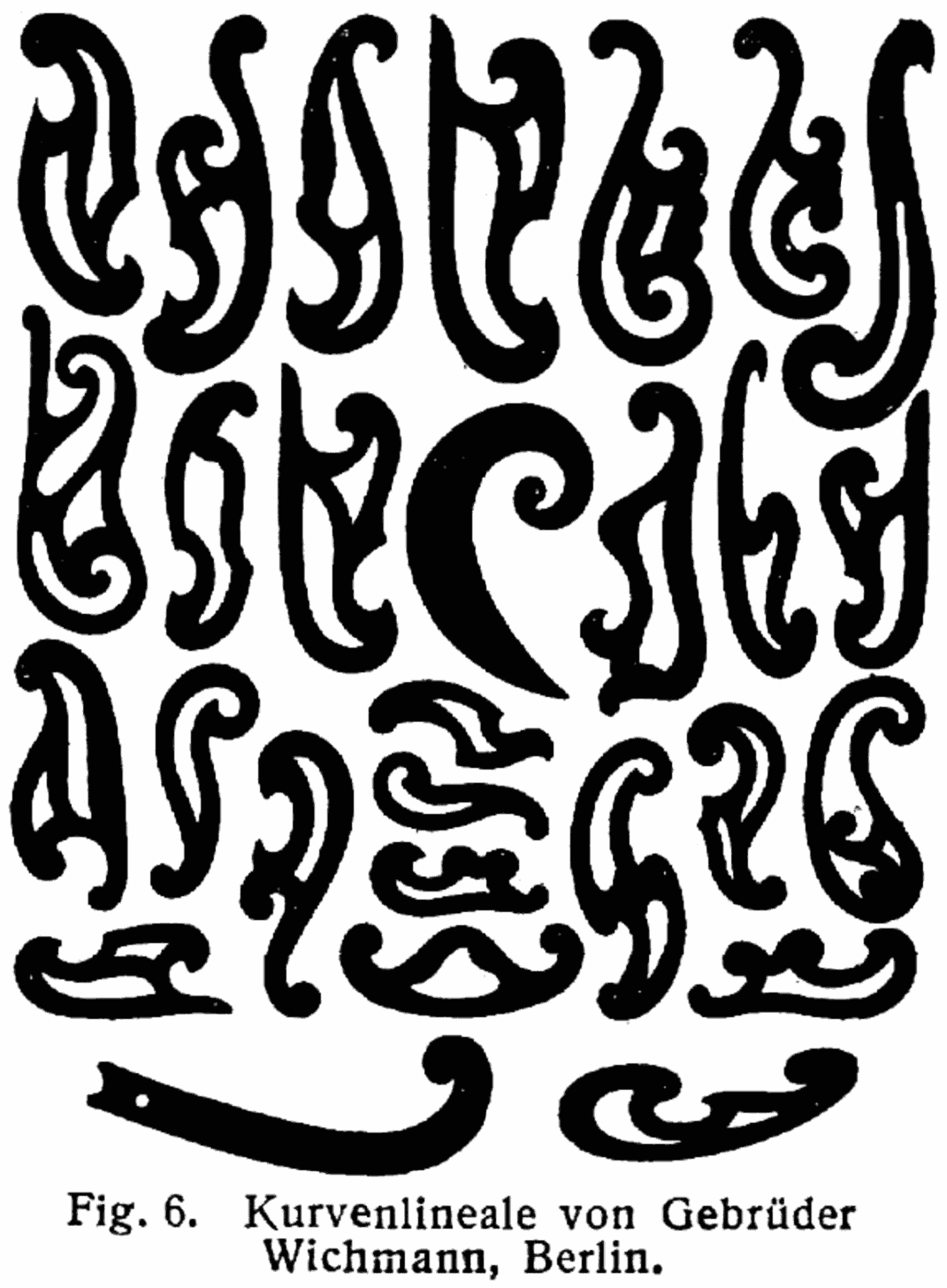
Various curved templates, commonly known as French curves. This image comes from the Lexikon der gesamten Technik (dictionary of technology) from 1904 by Otto Lueger

=== Compass ===
Compasses are used for drawing circles or arc segments of circles. One form has two straight legs joined by a hinge; one leg has a sharp pivot point and the other has a holder for a technical pen or pencil. Another form, the beam compass, has the pivot point and pen holder joined by a trammel bar, useful when drawing very large radius arcs. Often a circle template is used instead of a compass when predefined circle sizes are required.

=== Templates ===
Templates contain pre-dimensioned holes in the right scale to accurately draw a symbol or sign.

Letter templates are used for drawing text, including digits and letter characters. Diagrams are usually of a standard letter shape and size to conform to standards of encodings (e.g. DIN or ANSI). For example, in Finland the series used is 1.8 mm, 2.5 mm, 3.5 mm, 5.0 mm and 7.0 mm. Except for the very biggest ones, the templates are only suitable for technical pen drawing.

For drawing circles and circle-arcs, circle templates which contain a set of suitably-sized holes are used. Templates are also available for other geometric shapes such as squares and for drawing ellipses, as well as many specialized varieties for other purposes.

There are also specific templates to provide user with the most common symbols in use in different branches of designing. For example, the architect templates can be used to draw different sized doors with their "opening arcs", building and equipment symbols and furniture. The templates also provide the symbols for thermal insulation.

A geometry template is a piece of clear plastic with cut-out shapes and/or curves for use mainly by primary and secondary school students. Such templates often also include length and angle measurements. In Australia, where geometry templates are common school equipment, known brands include Mathomat and MathAid.

Two methods of drawing smooth curves in manual drafting are the use of French curves and flat splines (flexible curves). A French curve is a drawing aid with many different smoothly-varying radiused curves on it; the manual drafter can fit the French curve to some known reference points and draw a smooth curved line between them. A spline is a flexible ruler, usually rubber or plastic coated with a metal "backbone", which can be smoothly shaped to follow a desired curve and allows drawing a smooth line between initial reference points. Sometimes a spline is temporarily held in position with small weights.

=== Perspective machines ===
A perspective machine is an instrument designed to create perspective drawings.

== Drawing materials ==
=== Drafting paper ===
Silk-paper-like translucent drafting paper that wrinkles when wetted. It is primarily suitable for pencils and felt tip pens. Pencil marks can be corrected to some extent with an eraser.

=== Thick draft paper ===
Sandwich-paper-like, thin translucent sheet of paper. Manufactured in different strengths, the surface may be slightly polished. This paper also wrinkles upon wetting. Suitable for pencil and felt tipped pens, and with limitations for technical pens. An eraser can be used for pencil lines. Ink is difficult to erase without damage.

=== Cloth ===
Drafting linen was formerly used for technical drawings. It was durable and held up to handling, but it was difficult to use in modern whiteprints for reproduction, and shrinking was a concern.

=== Tracing paper ===
Polished sandwich paper-like, translucent thick paper, which comes in different strengths. Wrinkles upon wetting. Suitable for both graphite pencils and technical pens. An eraser or sharp scraper tool is used for corrections.

=== Tracing tube ===
Translucent plastic film, which is usually of gray or a light khaki shade. Common types are 0.05, 0.07 and 0.10 mm thick. These films are also used in photocopying. The most commonly used materials are polyesters, and sometimes also PVC or polycarbonate; arguably, a proprietary eponym or genericized trademark for this is called Mylar.

=== Inks ===
Drawing inks can be divided into two groups: India ink and polymer inks. India ink is used on paper and drafting film plastics. The most commonly used India ink is a colloidal mixture of water and carbon black.

=== Dry transfer ===
Dry transfer decals can speed the production of repetitive drawing elements such as borders, title blocks, line types, shading, and symbols. They were frequently used in the production of schematic drawings, maps, and printed circuit board artwork, for example. Dry transfer lettering such as Letraset was used especially in lettering larger size document annotations, or when consistency of lettering was especially required.

== Reproduction ==
Many copies of technical drawings may be required in the construction of a project. Reproductions must be accurate as to size and shape, but for many purposes need not be permanent. The blueprint process was first used for mechanical reproduction of drawings. Drawing offices may use diazo or whiteprint processes. Where the volume of drawings reproduced justifies the cost of the machine, a large format photocopier using xerography can reproduce drawings at lower cost than re-plotting them.

== See also ==
- Pantograph
- Architectural drawing – Technical drawing of a building or building project
- Architectural reprography
- Drawing – Marking a surface to create images
- Computer-aided design – Constructing product by means of computer
- Isometric projection – Method for visually representing three-dimensional objects
- Orthographic projection – Means of projecting three-dimensional objects in two dimensions
