= Technical pen =

Writing implement designed to make lines of constant width

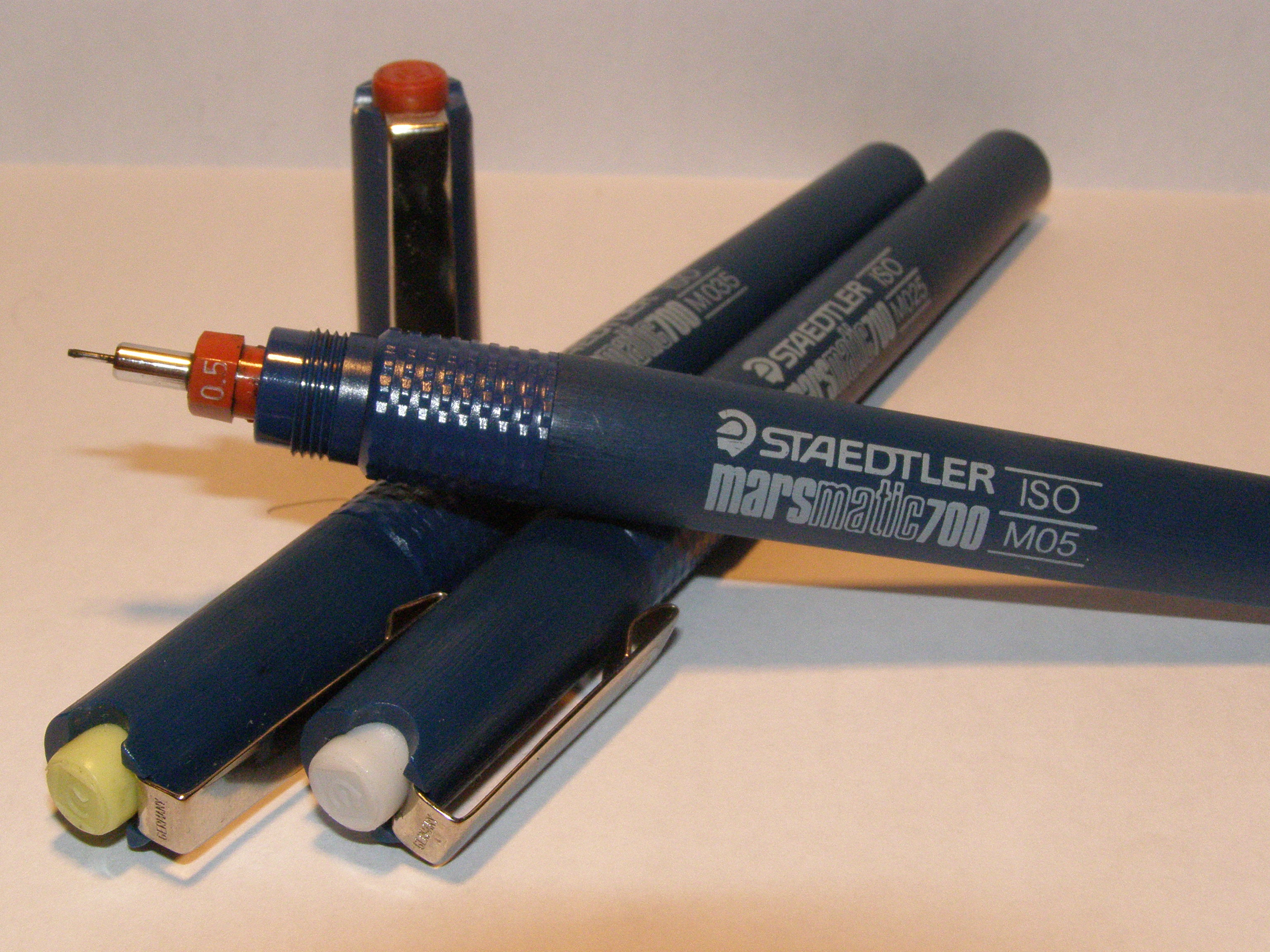
Staedtler technical pens

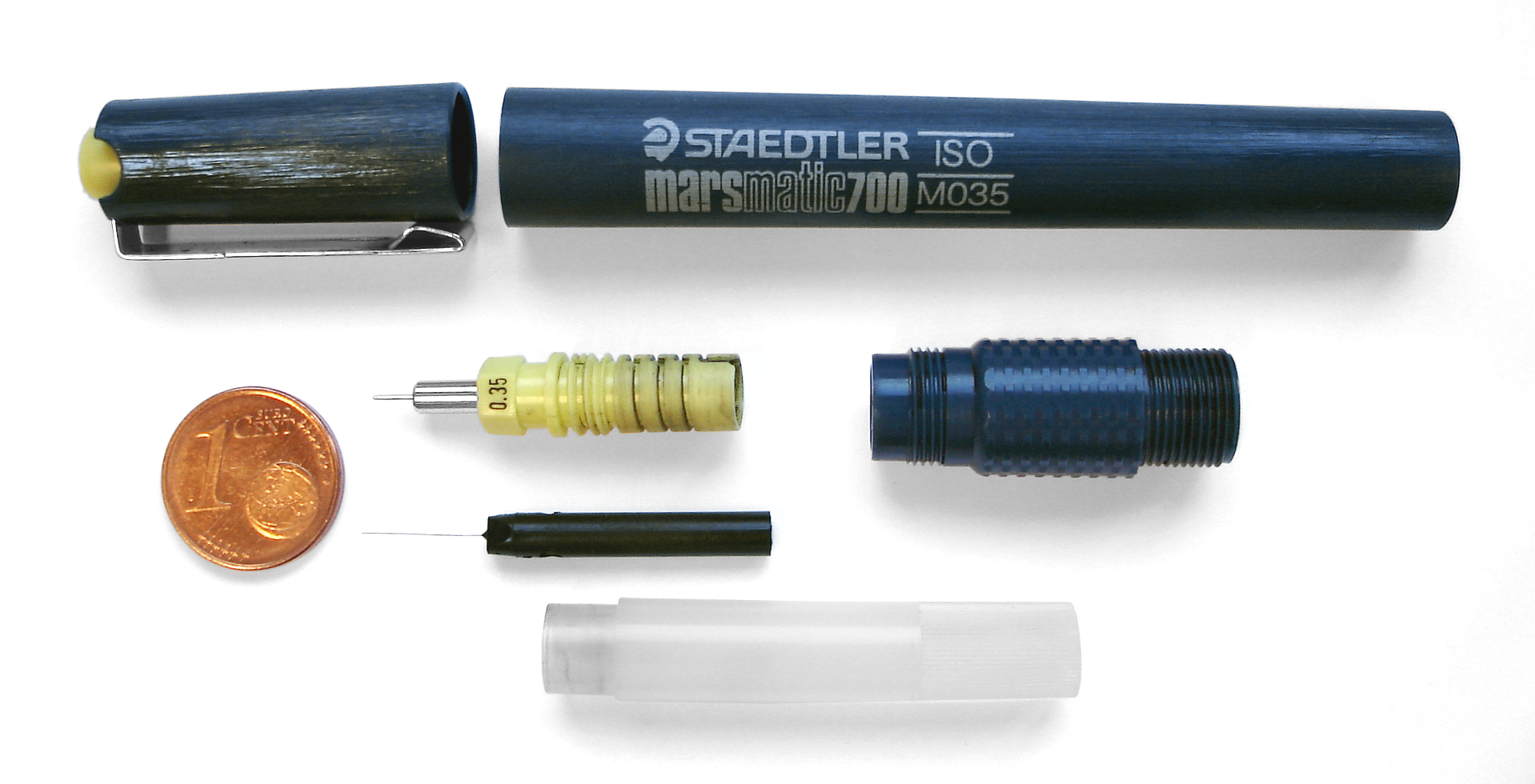
Staedtler technical pen divided in parts in comparison with 1 cent euro coin

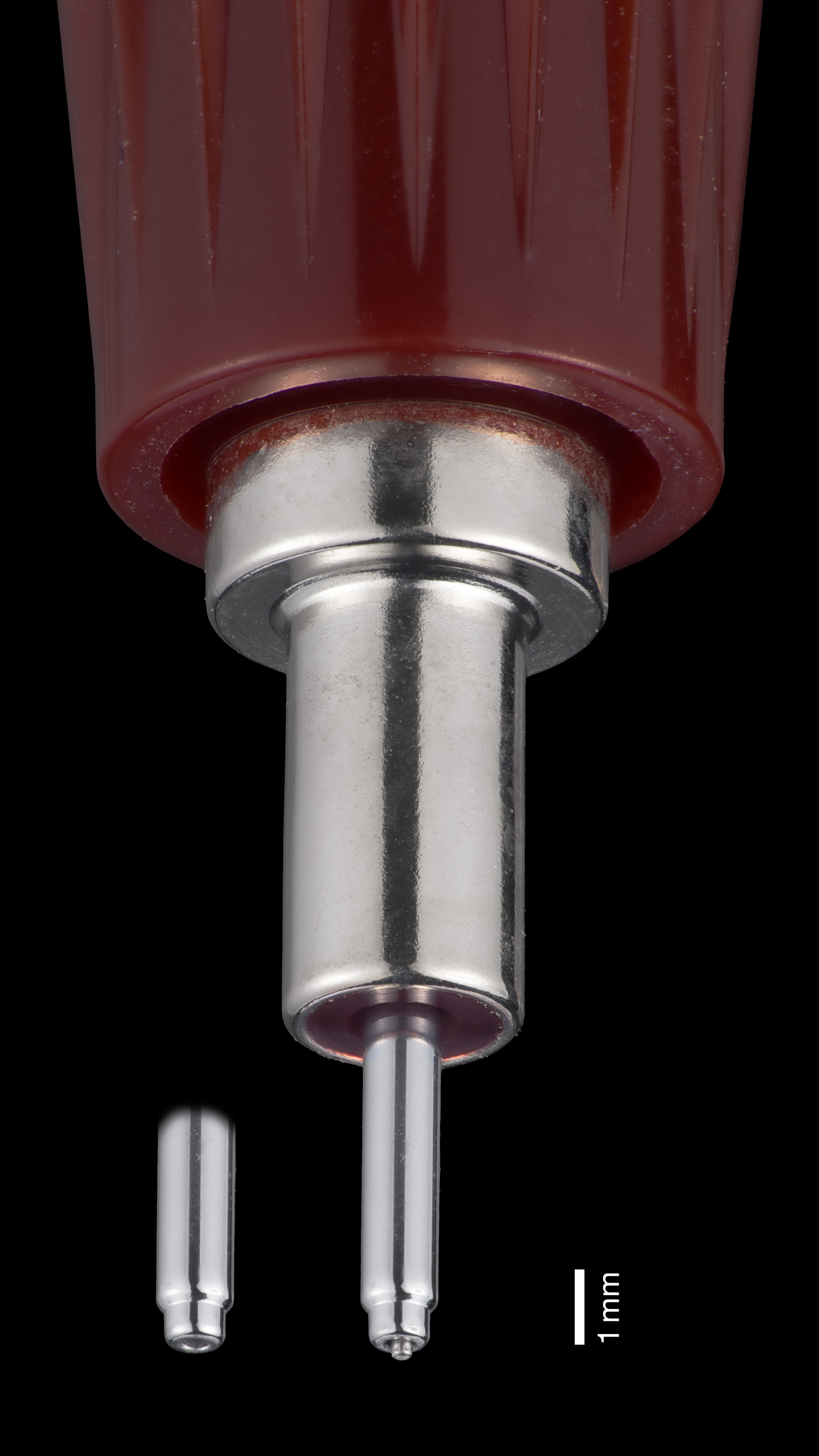
Macro image of a 0.7 mm Rotring Rapidograph nib showing the flow control wire

A technical pen is a specialized instrument used by an engineer, architect, or drafter to make lines of constant width for architectural, engineering, or technical drawings. Technical pens may use either a refillable ink reservoir or a replaceable ink cartridge.

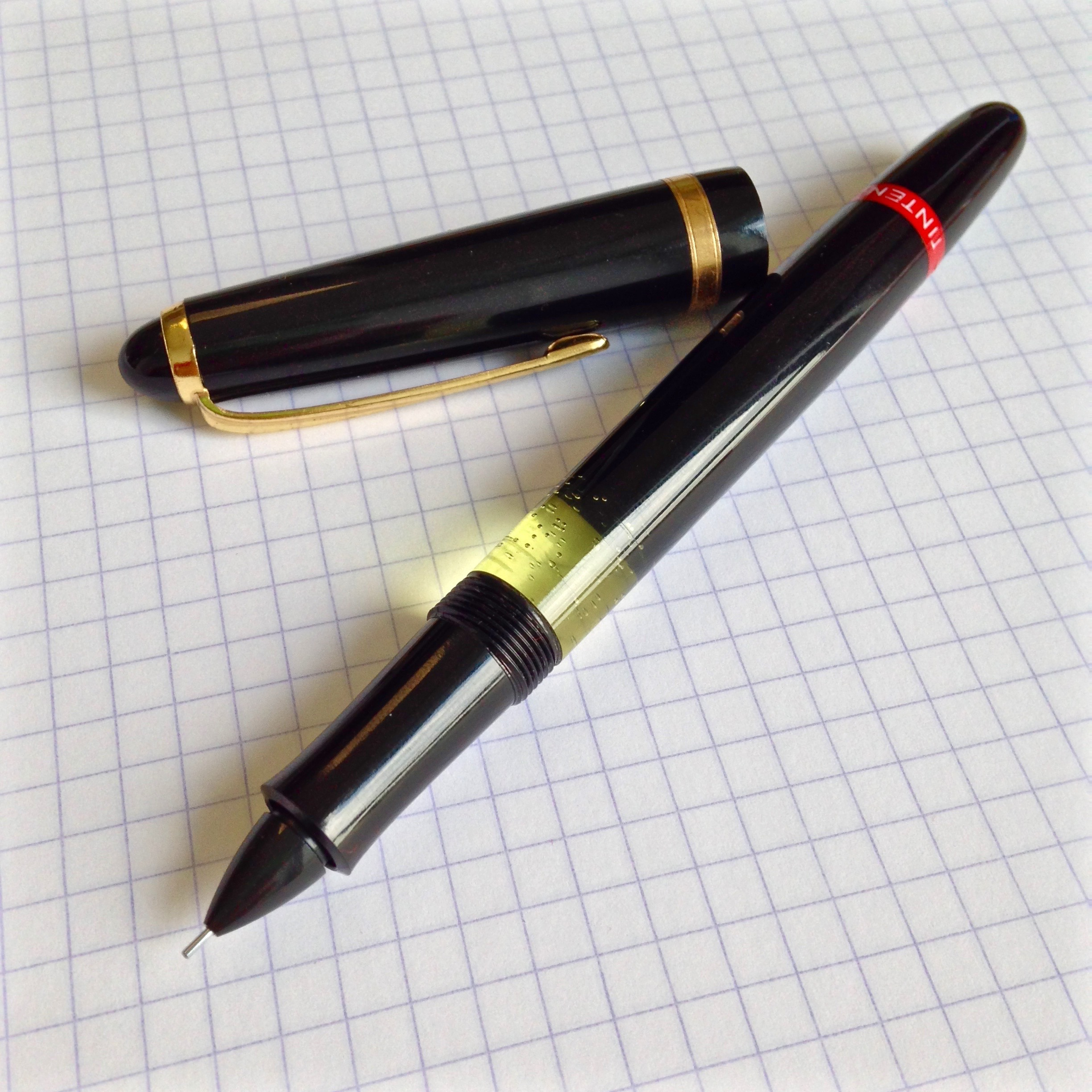
A Rotring Technical Pen

== History ==
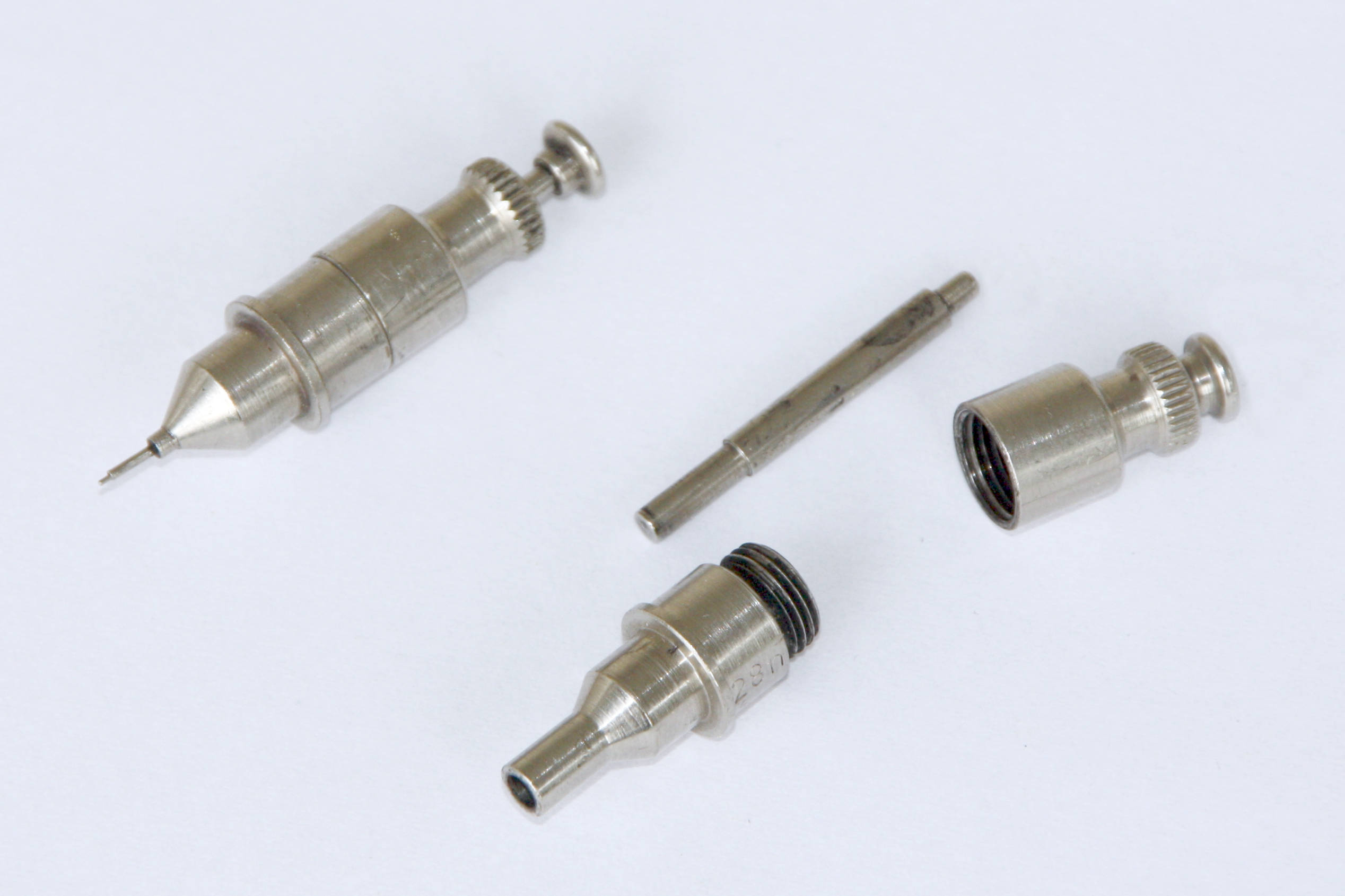
Funnel drafting nib assembled (upper left) and disassembled showing component parts

Early technical pens (ruling pens) consisted of a small pair of calipers, having one flat and one bowed leg holding ink between them. By adjusting the gap between the legs the width of the line drawn by the pen could be adjusted. Such pens, kept at a constant angle to the paper, were used for ruling lines, but not for cursive handwriting, nor for off-hand flourishes. The Graphos technical pen introduced in 1934 miniaturized the caliper principle and made the points easily interchangeable. The Sheaffer company produced an expensive drafting set which included such pens for use on linen prints. These sets were often presented to a draftsman upon completing 'time served', which marked the end of the apprenticeship.

== Fountain pen versions ==
In the 1950s, fountain pens with cylindrical points became available, guaranteeing a constant line thickness. These are complex instruments with tubes holding a tiny shaft. The original funnel drafting nibs had a small reservoir of ink and were mounted at an angle in the holder to allow them to be comfortably used while still maintaining a vertical orientation to the paper. To release ink the shaft is depressed and a line of about the width of the exterior diameter of the tube can be drawn. Additionally, in later models, the tube had a small ledge that effectively narrowed its end, that—while maintaining the line thickness—made the tube thicker along most of its length and also protected ink from spilling while drawing along the edge of a rule, set-square, T-square or other template (the ink had no immediate contact with the template's edge). Some special, more expensive nibs were equipped with tubes made of tungsten carbide or with their tips made of synthetic precious stones such as sapphire, to slow their wear on hard surfaces.

== Ink tubes ==
In the 1960s, the pen's design evolved to feature tubes of ink that were filled with a Pasteur pipette or from a narrow spout on a special bottle of ink. Such pens frequently came in sets of various sizes, and several pen points which were installed into the holders that also contained a filled fountain, which in turn would be screwed into a handle. The construction and number of parts varied depending on the company, and the parts were not cross-compatible in most cases. Some later designs (like the Staedtler MarsMatic700) had specially designed channels to allow better air flow in between the wall of the external grip and the point assembly. This made ink flow more reliable. The general drawback of this group of pens is that they have to be frequently and carefully cleaned to remove all ink from the tubing, otherwise it would set and could not be removed.

== Brands ==
In the United States, several firms produced this kind of technical pen: WRICO, Leroy, and Koh-I-Noor. Each had its own proprietary sequence of line widths, meaning that the widths were not standardized across the industry, and each company's specifications for the widths did not match the others. And the specifications were given as fractions of an inch instead of fractions of a millimeter. In the case of technical pens made for the US market, they were marked with both proprietary symbolic expressions (4×0, 3×0, 2×0, 0, 1, 2 etc.) and standard metric dimensions denominated in millimetres.

For the rest of the world, the most recognized brands were Staedtler, Rotring, and Faber-Castell; currently only Koh-I-Noor USA, Rotring, Rystor, Aristo, Staedtler, and Trident Desegraph (from Brazil) still make the traditional technical pen. Some other brands that manufacture technical pens not following ISO standards are Faber-Castell, Isomars, Alvin, Hero, and Standardgraph.

== Technical information ==
Rotring Rapidographs in ISO nib sizes

A full set of pens would have the following nib sizes: 0.10, 0.13, 0.18, 0.25, 0.35, 0.50, 0.70, 1.0, 1.4, and 2.0 mm, which correspond to the line widths as defined in ISO 128. However, the International Organization for Standardization (ISO) called for four pen widths and set a colour code for each: 0.25 (white), 0.35 (yellow), 0.5 (brown), 0.7 (blue); these nibs produced lines that related to various text character heights and the ISO paper sizes.

Diameter (mm)	Diameter (in)	ISO 128 colour code
0.25	0.010	White
0.35	0.014	Yellow
0.50	0.020	Brown
0.70	0.028	Blue

Line width (mm)	0.10	0.13	0.18	0.25	0.35	0.50	0.70	1.0	1.4	2.0
ISO 9175-1 Colour	Maroon	Violet	Red	White	Yellow	Brown	Blue	Orange	Green	Gray

Text (produced by an ISO stencil template for use with the technical pens) of 5 mm in height has a stroke or line thickness of 0.5 mm, and so requires a brown-nibbed 0.5 mm pen. If this text were used in an ISO-sized document (e.g. A0), and the document were reproduced at half its original height (A2), the text would be rendered 2.5 mm high with a stroke thickness of 0.25 mm—the white-nib size. Thus, changes to reductions or enlargements can be made easily as everything is in proportion. This worldwide standard (excepting Canada and the United States) ensures that drawings can always be legible even after microfilming, photocopying, and faxing.

The main drafting sets of four nibs came in two kinds: Gold and Silver. The Silver (steel tip) was for rough tracing paper, and the Gold (tungsten tip or jewel tip) was for plastic film (velograph or durables). Drawing boards changed as a result of technical pens—a hard (not spongy) surface was required, and when plastic film was used, the static attraction between plastic cursors, T-squares, set-squares etc. meant that as one lifted the edge from the film, the film would rise through static attraction and the ink would blot. The solution was to stick down a plastic sheet (Ozalid) that attracted the film more strongly than the drafting instruments. The tracing paper or velograph sheet would be placed on the Ozalid sheet stuck onto the drawing board and the air brushed away. Brushing charged the surface, and the film would then be taped taut (but released at the end of each working day to allow for overnight temperature expansions and contractions).

When pen plotters became widespread, a special variety of point assemblies was produced. These had the basic characteristics of the standard pen nib, but the tube was much thicker to strengthen it against quick lateral movements. Only the tip of the tube had the desired, line-size width. They fell out of use as plotters were replaced with ink-jet printers.

While the Rapidograph style of pen is still widely used by artists, the use of computer-aided design (CAD) has largely replaced the need for manual drafting. Also, the development of felt-tip, ink-based pens has provided cheaper, lower-maintenance disposable tools that sell much better than traditional technical pens.

== See also ==
- List of pen types, brands and companies
- Stylus
- ISO 216 § Matching technical pen widths
