= Drafting linen =

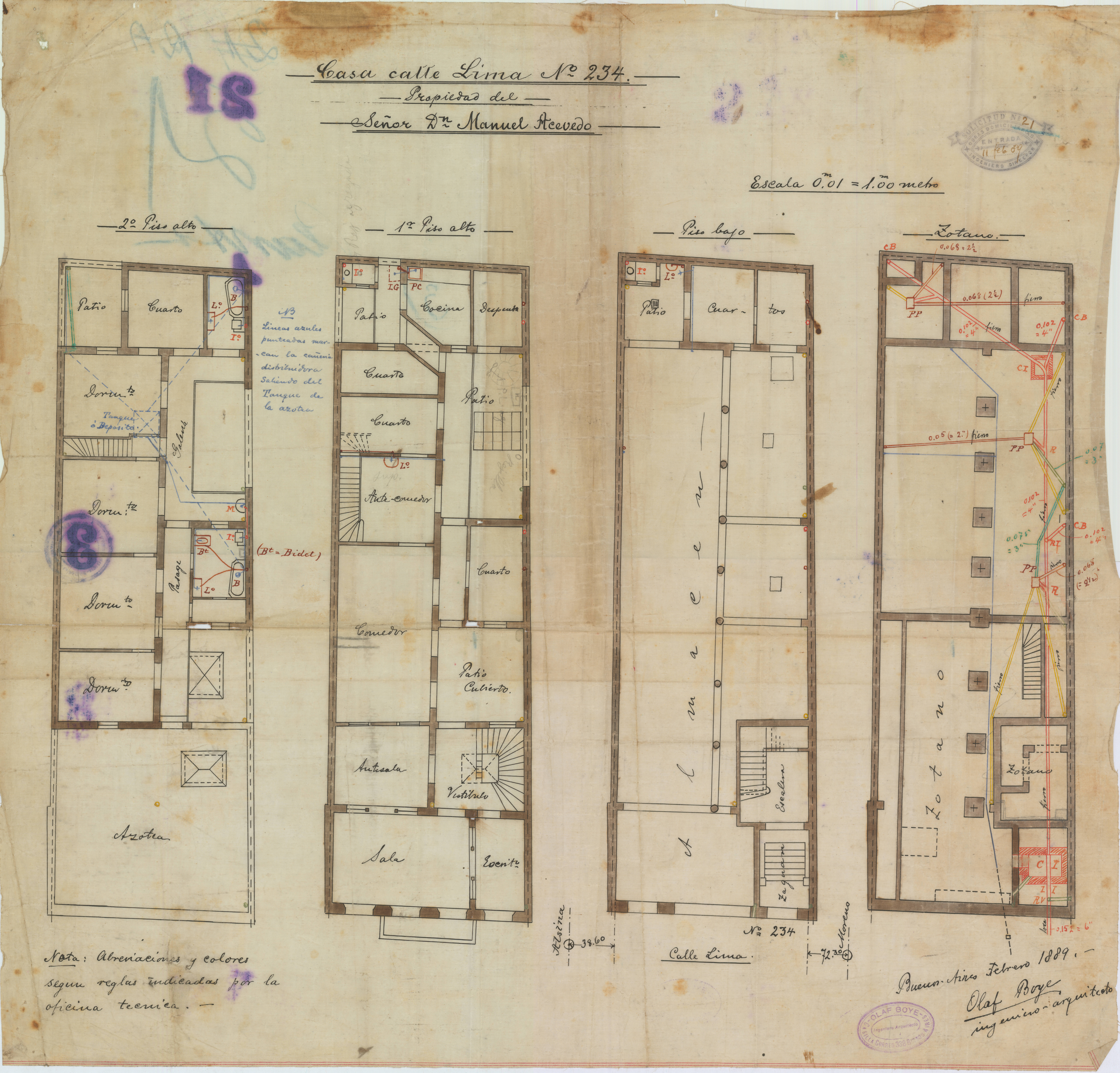
Very old drafting linen

From the late 19th century until the middle of the 20th century, drafting linen, also known as drafting cloth, was commonly used as an alternative to wood-pulp and rag papers in creating technical drawings. Its major benefits were considerable strength, especially in erasing and redrawing, durability in handling, and translucency for making multiple reprographic prints.

Manufactured as an undyed muslin woven fabric, typically using cotton or linen fiber, the textile was highly starched and then calendered to create a smooth surface for precise ink and graphite lines. Although drafting linen was most typically used in creating original drawings, it was occasionally used as the underlying support for blueprints and other similar reprographic processes. Drafting linen largely fell out of favor after the development of drafting film — varying in chemical composition from cellulose acetate to polyester—in the 1950s.

== See also ==
- Technical drawing tools
