= Staedtler =

German stationery manufacturing company

Staedtler SE

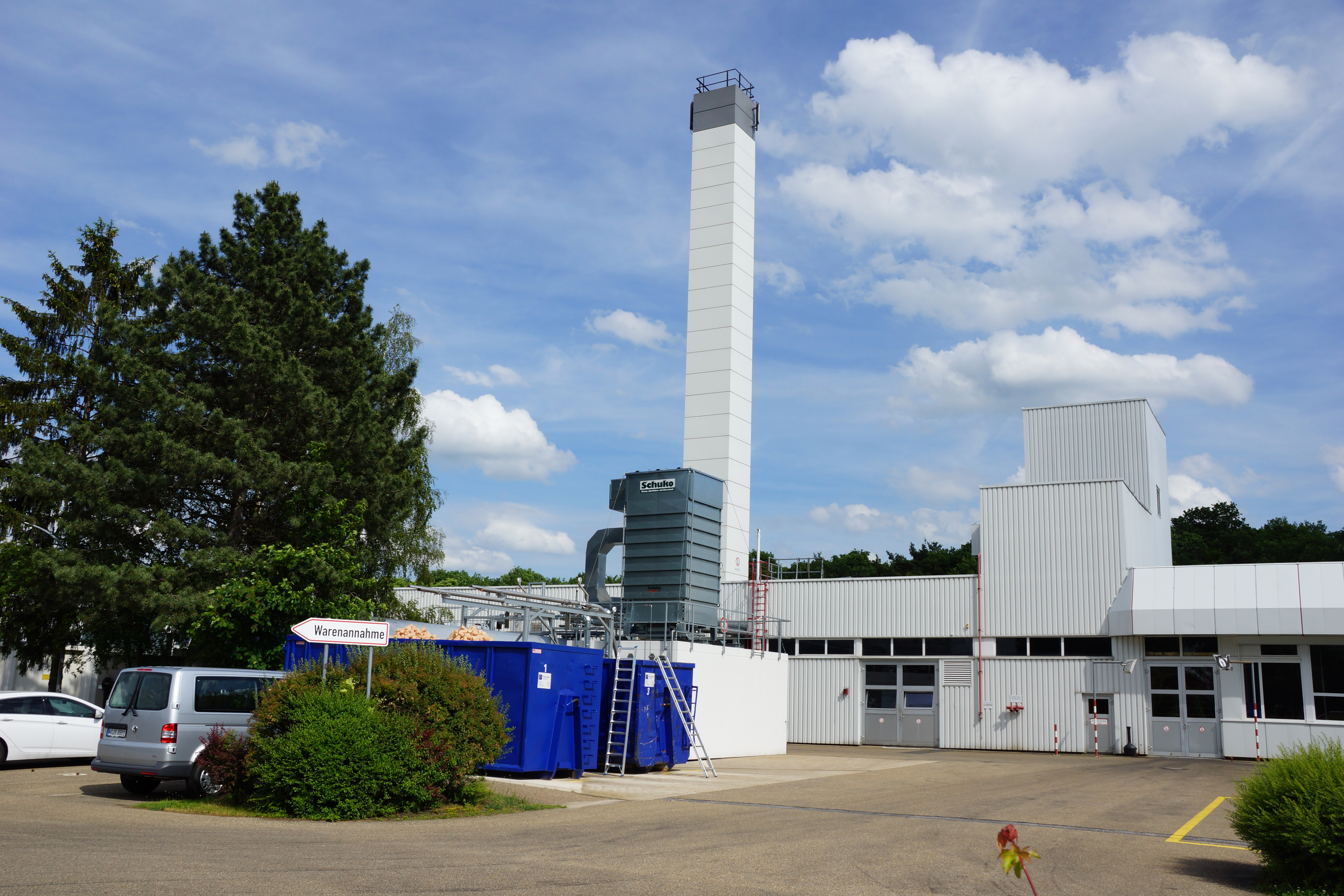
- Staedtler pencil factory in Neumarkt, 2013
- Formerly: Mars Pencil and Fountain Pen Factory (1937)
- Type: Private
- Industry: Stationery
- Founded: 3 October 1835; 190 years ago
- Founder: J.S. Staedtler
- Headquarters: Nuremberg, Germany
- Area served: Worldwide
- Key people: Matthias Greiner, Konstantin Czeschka (Managing Directors)
- Products: Writing implements; Art materials; Office supplies
- Brands: List: Ergosoft; Fimo; Karat; Lumocolor; Mars; Noris; Rasoplast; Textsurfer; Triplus
- Number of employees: 3,000
- Website: staedtler.com

Staedtler SE (German pronunciation: [ˈʃtɛtlɐ]) is a German multinational stationery manufacturing company based in Nuremberg. The firm was founded by J.S. Staedtler (1800–1872) in 1835 and produces a large variety of stationery products, such as writing implements (including technical drawing instruments), art materials, and office supplies.

Staedtler claims to be the largest European manufacturer of wood-cased pencils, overhead projector pens, mechanical pencils, leads, erasers, and modelling clays. Staedtler has over 26 global subsidiaries and nine manufacturing facilities. Almost two thirds of the production is in four facilities in Nuremberg, Germany. Some of its products are made in Japan. Its "Noris" line of pencils is extremely common in British schools.

== History ==
The origins of the brand can be traced to the 17th century, when Friedrich Staedtler took over the full pencil manufacturing process, from the lead to the wood. However, that activity was forbidden by the Council of Nuremberg, which stated that the manufacturing had to be developed by two different experts. Staedtler's work eventually helped to abolish that regulation, thereby facilitating the work of other pencil manufacturers in Nuremberg.

The company was founded by Johann Sebastian Staedtler in 1835 as a pencil factory in Nuremberg, but the roots of the company are traced back to 1662, when references to Friedrich Staedtler as a pencil-making craftsman were made in the city annals. Staedtler received permission from the municipal council to produce black lead, red chalk and pastel pencils in his industrial plant. In 1866, the company had 54 employees and produced 15,000 gross (2,160,000 pencils) per year.

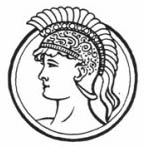
First version of the "head of Mars" logo, released in 1908

In 1900, Staedtler registered the Mars brand, representing the Ancient Roman god of war, along with the head of Mars logo. The Mars name was used for some lines of products. Staedtler products were distributed in Italy in the same year. In 1901 the company launched the Noris brand.

In 1922 a United States subsidiary was established in New York, followed four years later by a Japanese subsidiary. In 1937 the name was changed to Mars Pencil and Fountain Pen Factory and the product range was expanded to include mechanical writing instruments. In 1949, Staedtler began the production of ballpoint pens, which started to be widely used instead of fountain pens (although Staedtler still produces the latter today).

In 1950 propelling pencils (or mechanical pencils) began to be manufactured, the first being made out of wood. Four years later, the "Lumocolor" brand was registered. This brand was used to design the wide range of Staedtler markers. The head of Mars became the Staedtler definitive logo in 1958. This logo has had several style modifications since then, the last in 2001.

In 1962 the company began producing technical pens. In 1967 the Italian subsidiary, in Milan, was established. In the 1970s, Staedtler bought the Neumarkt factory, which used to be the Eberhard Faber factory. Nevertheless, in 2009 Staedtler sold the rights to the brand "Eberhard Faber" to Faber-Castell, although the company kept the Neumarkt factory, where Staedtler makes wood pencils nowadays.

The company celebrated its 175th anniversary in 2010. Since then, Fimo modelling clay and the Mali, Aquasoft and several other brands have been marketed under the Staedtler name.

== Products ==
Staedtler's products include: Noris, Mars Lumograph (pencils); Mars plastic (erasers); 925- series (mechanical pencils), Mars micro (pencil leads); Triplus (fineliners); Textsurfer (highlighters); Lumocolor (markers, colored pencils, etc.)The following table lists all the Staedtler product lines:

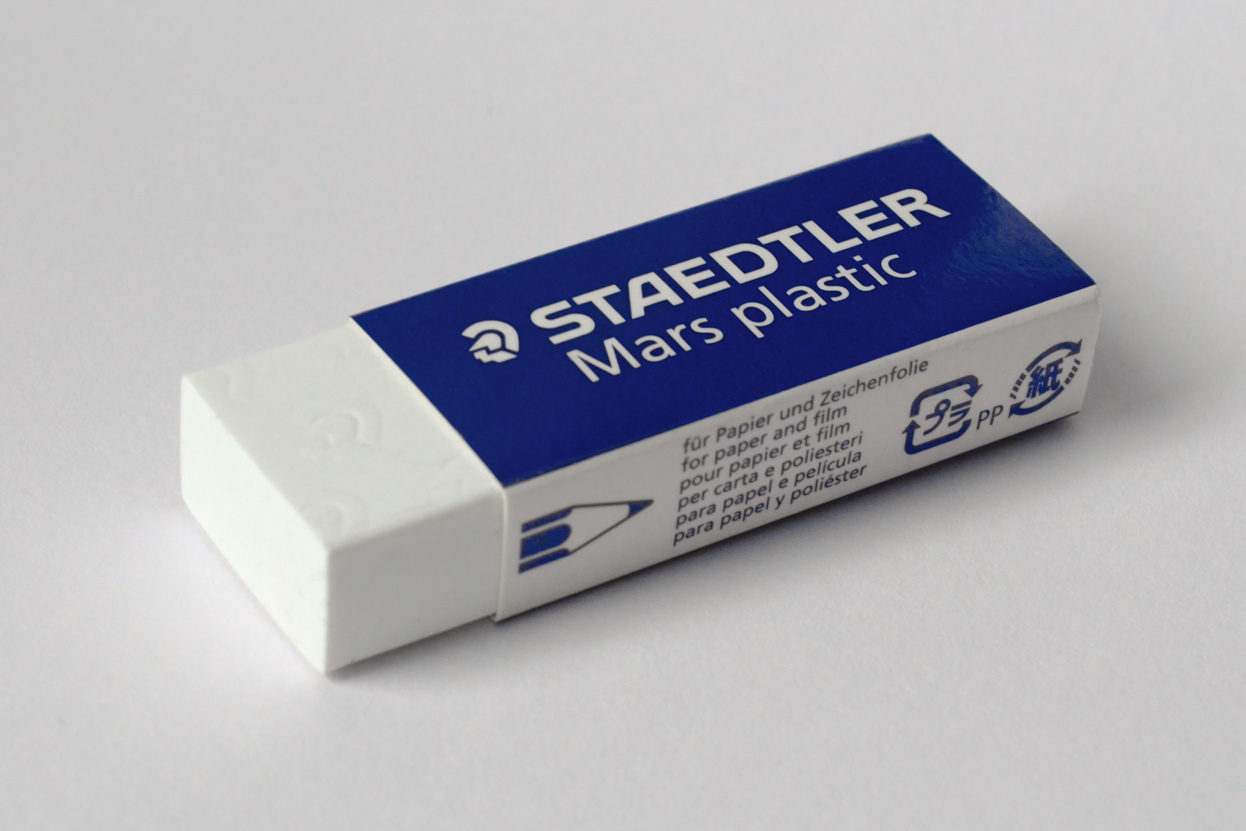
Staedtler's Mars plastic eraser product

Category	Products
Writing implements	Graphite pencils, mechanical pencils, leads, markers, highlighters, ballpoint pens, rollerball pens, lead pencils, refills
Technical drawing	Technical pens, compasses, rulers, set squares, drawing boards, lettering guides
Art materials	Colored pencils, crayons, chalks, oil pastels, paints, modelling clay, inks
Accessories	Erasers, pencil sharpeners

== Awards ==
Staedtler has won awards for its products, most recently for the Wopex Graphite Pencils (designed with "Teams Design") and the Triplus line.

=== 2008 ===
- Red Dot Award, Lumocolor Twister Dry Markers

=== 2009 ===
- Bio Composite of the Year, Wopex Graphite Pencils
- ISH Design Plus Award, Wopex Graphite Pencils
- Red Dot Award, Triplus 776 Mechanical Pencils

=== 2011 ===
- Red Dot Award, Triplus 426 Ballpoint Pens

== See also ==
- Faber-Castell
- Rotring
