= Drafting film =

Alternative to drafting paper

Drafting film is a sturdier and more dimensionally stable substitute for drafting paper sometimes used for technical drawings, especially architectural drawings, and for art layout drawings, replacing drafting linen for these purposes. Linen and paper, such as bond and vellum, for reason of the organic origins like cotton, may shrink due to humidity and changes in the temperature.

Nowadays it is almost invariably made of transparent biaxially oriented polyethylene terephthalate, which should last several centuries under normal storage conditions, with one or two translucent matte surfaces provided by a coating. However, some older drafting films are cellulose acetate, which degrades in only a few decades due to the vinegar syndrome. Uncoated films are preferred for archival, because there is then no possibility that the coating material could deteriorate over time or react with other materials.

Uncoated films require the use of an etching ink that penetrates the surface of the film.

Because non-etching ink doesn't penetrate the surface of the film the way it penetrates paper, it is often possible to remove inked lines from drafting film when drawing on it by hand; an abrasive-free vinyl drafting eraser is the preferred tool for this, although a scalpel works too. For the same reason, graphite on the surface tends to smear; there are polyester pencil drafting leads available as a substitute for graphite for drawing on drafting film. Different matte coatings (generally consisting of amorphous silica particles dispersed in a resin) are better suited for graphite or for polyester leads.

Manual drawing on drafting film requires special care with cleanliness, because oil from the illustrator's hands can form skid patches on the film's nonporous surface, where ink and pencil will not adhere to the matte surface, while drafting paper will absorb the oil.

Dimensional stability is important for scale drawings that don't have explicit dimensions, such as maps, because measurements may be taken directly from the drawing, so drawings that expand and shrink with temperature and humidity can introduce great imprecision into these measurements; some undimensioned drawing standards require the use of drafting film for such drawings.
