= Reprography =

Reproduction of graphics through electrical or mechanical means

Reprography (a portmanteau of reproduction and photography) is the reproduction of graphics through mechanical or electrical means, such as photography or xerography. Reprography is commonly used in catalogs and archives, as well as in the architectural, engineering, and construction industries.

== Overview ==
In the United States, the industry is relatively small, with approximately 3000 firms. It comprises entrepreneurial businesses serving predominantly the large- and wide-format reproduction needs of the legal, architectural, engineering, manufacturing, retail, and advertising industries. Average sales volume is about $1.5 million per year and average employee counts are 20–25 people.

Large-format reproductions are produced with a variety of technologies dependent, in part, on the application of the final product and quantity needed. Examples of typical reproduction methods include: diazo (blueline), electrostatic (xerographic), photographic, laser, and ink jet.

Reproductions can be made from the same size or smaller/larger hard copy originals. Prints can also be computer generated from CADD (computer aided design and drafting) files or from a growing variety of desktop publishing and design software packages.

In addition to addressing the large-format reproduction needs of their customers, reprographers frequently sell reprographic equipment and consumable supplies. Other business services such as mounting and lamination, quick copying, microfilming, scanning and facility management may also be provided.

Typical items produced by reprographers include architectural/engineering blueprints and renderings, indoor and outdoor signage, maps, billboards, backlit displays, trade show graphics, legal and medical exhibits, etc. Most of the reprographics firms in the United States belong to the International Reprographic Association (IRgA).

Reprographics is also referred to as reproprinting.

== See also ==
- Blueprint
- Duplicating machines
- Image scanner
- List of duplicating processes
- Overprinting
- Photocopying
- Whiteprint
