= Artwork (graphic arts) =

Artwork (also known as art layoutdrawing) is a type of drawing that serves a graphical representation of an image for its reproduction onto a substrate via various processes, such as silkscreen, label making and other printing methods. Transfer of the image often involves a photographic process.

Historically, some types of artworks were prepared on clear polyester drafting film or similar media for strength, durability and dimensional stability. Modern artwork may be stored electronically, such as those created in Adobe Illustrator file format (.ai).

== See also ==
- Engineering drawings
- Logo
