= Geometry template =

Mathematical drafting tool

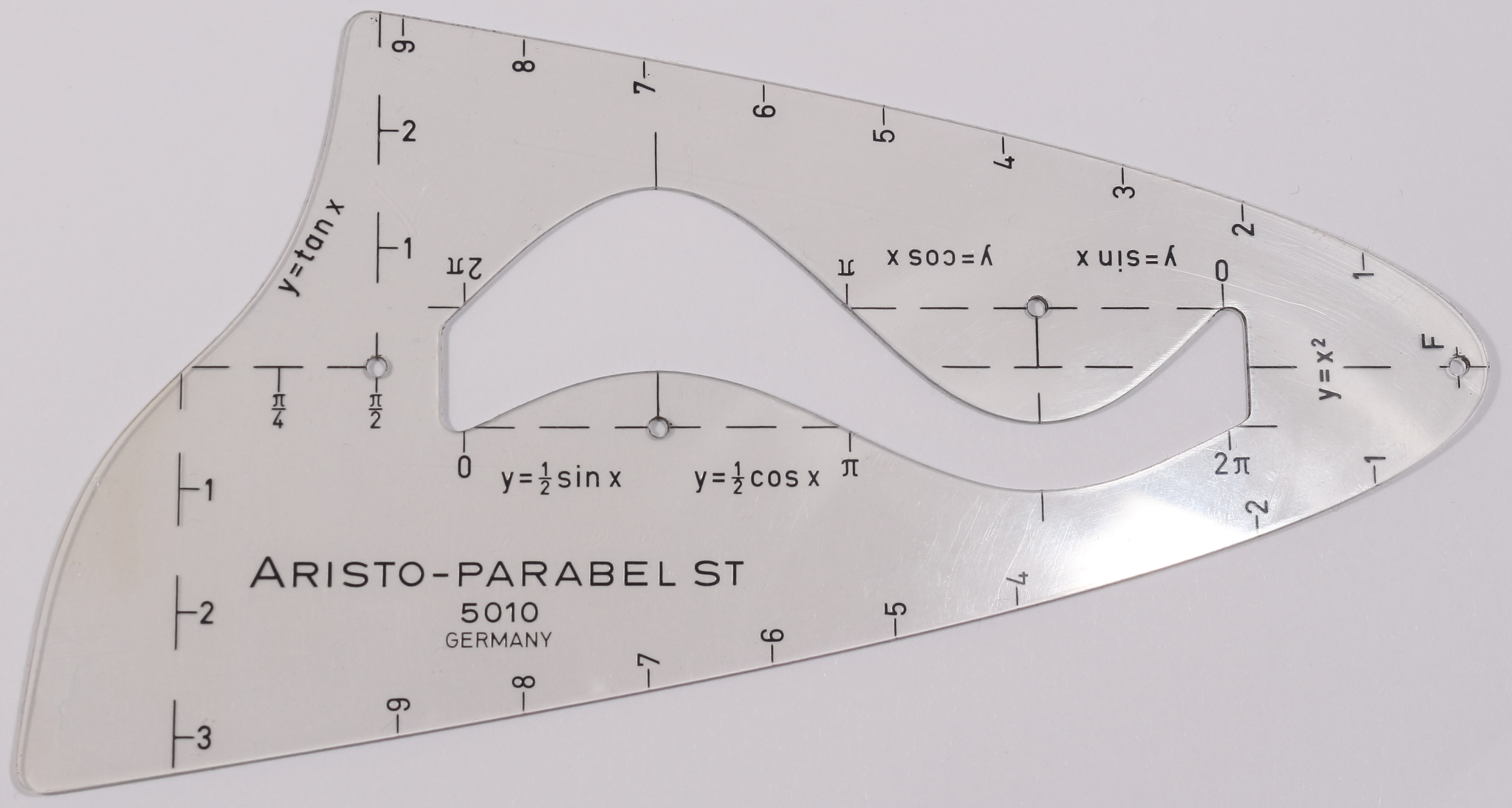
Stencil for the curves of y=x^{2}, y=tan(x), y=sin(x), and y=1/2sin(x).

A geometry template is a piece of clear plastic with cut-out shapes for use in mathematics and other subjects in primary school through secondary school. It also has various measurements on its sides to be used like a ruler. In Australia, popular brands include Mathomat and MathAid.

== Brands ==
=== Mathomat and Mathaid ===
Mathomat is a trademark used for a plastic stencil developed in Australia by Craig Young in 1969, who originally worked as an engineering tradesperson in the Government Aircraft Factories (GAF) in Melbourne before retraining and working as head of mathematics in a secondary school in Melbourne. Young designed Mathomat to address what he perceived as limitations of traditional mathematics drawing sets in classrooms, mainly caused by students losing parts of the sets. The Mathomat stencil has a large number of geometric shapes stencils combined with the functions of a technical drawing set (rulers, set squares, protractor and circles stencils to replace a compass).

The template made use polycarbonate – a new type of thermoplastic polymer when Mathomat first came out – which was strong and transparent enough to allow for a large number of stencil shapes to be included in its design without breaking or tearing. The first template was exhibited in 1970 at a mathematics conference in Melbourne along with a series of popular mathematics teaching lesson plan; it became an immediate success with a large number of schools specifying it as a required students purchase. As of 2017, the stencil is widely specified in Australian schools, chiefly for students at early secondary school level. The manufacturing of Mathomat was taken over in 1989 by the W&G drawing instrument company, which had a factory in Melbourne for manufacture of technical drawing instruments. Young also developed MathAid, which was initially produced by him when he was living in Ringwood, Victoria. He later sold the company.

W&G published a series of teacher resource books for Mathomat authored by various teachers and academics who were interested in Mathomat as a teaching product.

== See also ==
- French curve
- Protractor
- Ruler
- Technical drawing tools
