= T-square =

Technical drawing instrument

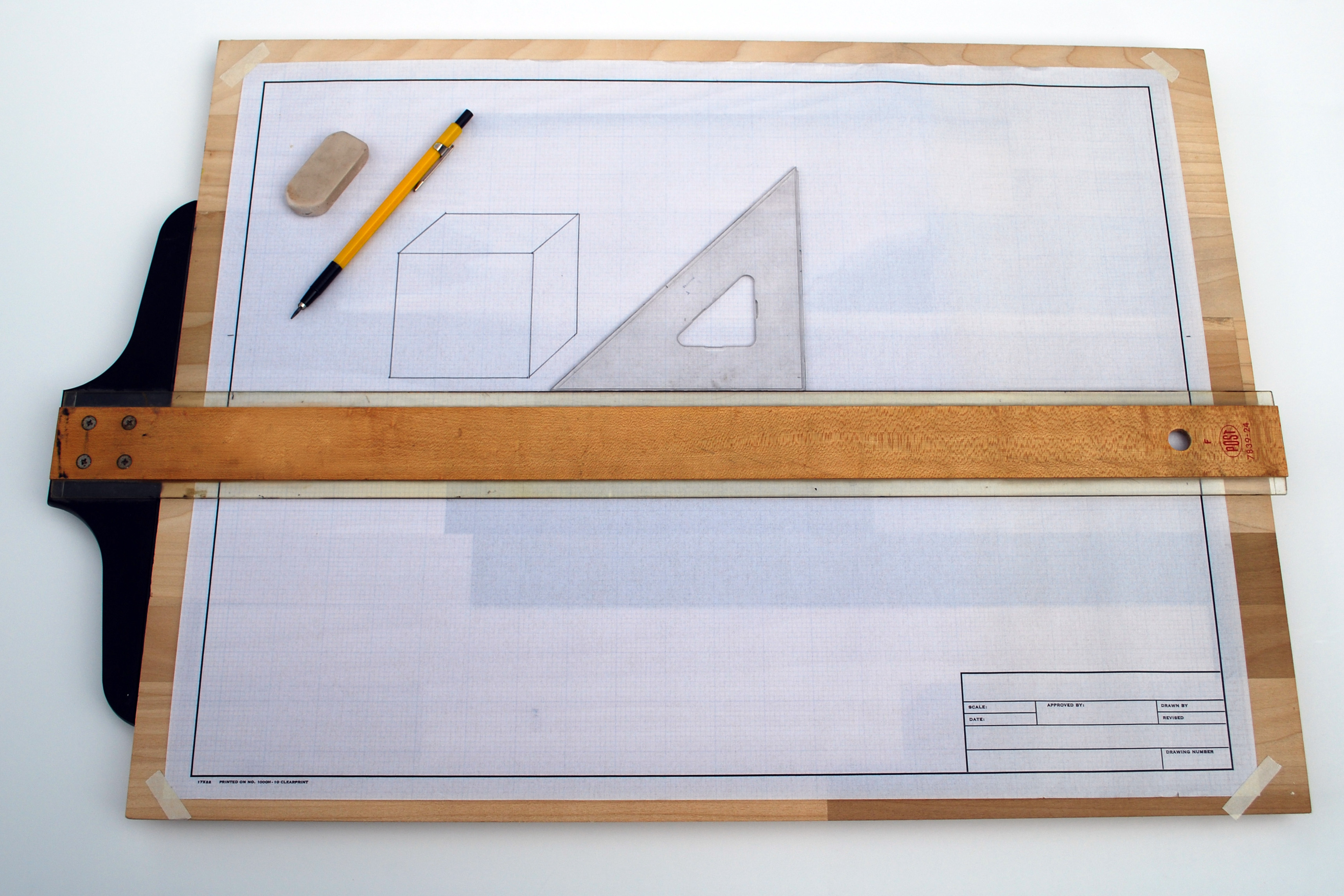
Drafting board with a T-square and set square

A T-square is a technical drawing instrument used by draftsmen primarily as a guide for drawing horizontal lines on a drafting table. The instrument is named after its resemblance to the letter T, with a long shaft called the "blade" and a short shaft called the "stock" or "head". T-squares are available in a range of sizes, with common lengths being 18 inches (460 mm), 24 inches (610 mm), 30 inches (760 mm), 36 inches (910 mm) and 42 inches (1,100 mm).

In addition to drawing horizontal lines, a T-square can be used with a set square to draw vertical or diagonal lines. The T-square usually has a transparent edge made of plastic which should be free of nicks and cracks in order to provide smooth, straight lines.

T-squares are also used in various industries, such as construction. For example, drywall T-squares are typically made of aluminum and have a 48-inch-long (120 cm) tongue, allowing them to be used for measuring and cutting drywall. In woodworking, higher-end table saws often have T-square fences attached to a rail on the front side of the table, providing improved accuracy and precision when cutting wood.

== See also ==
- Technical drawing tools
