= Architectural reprography =

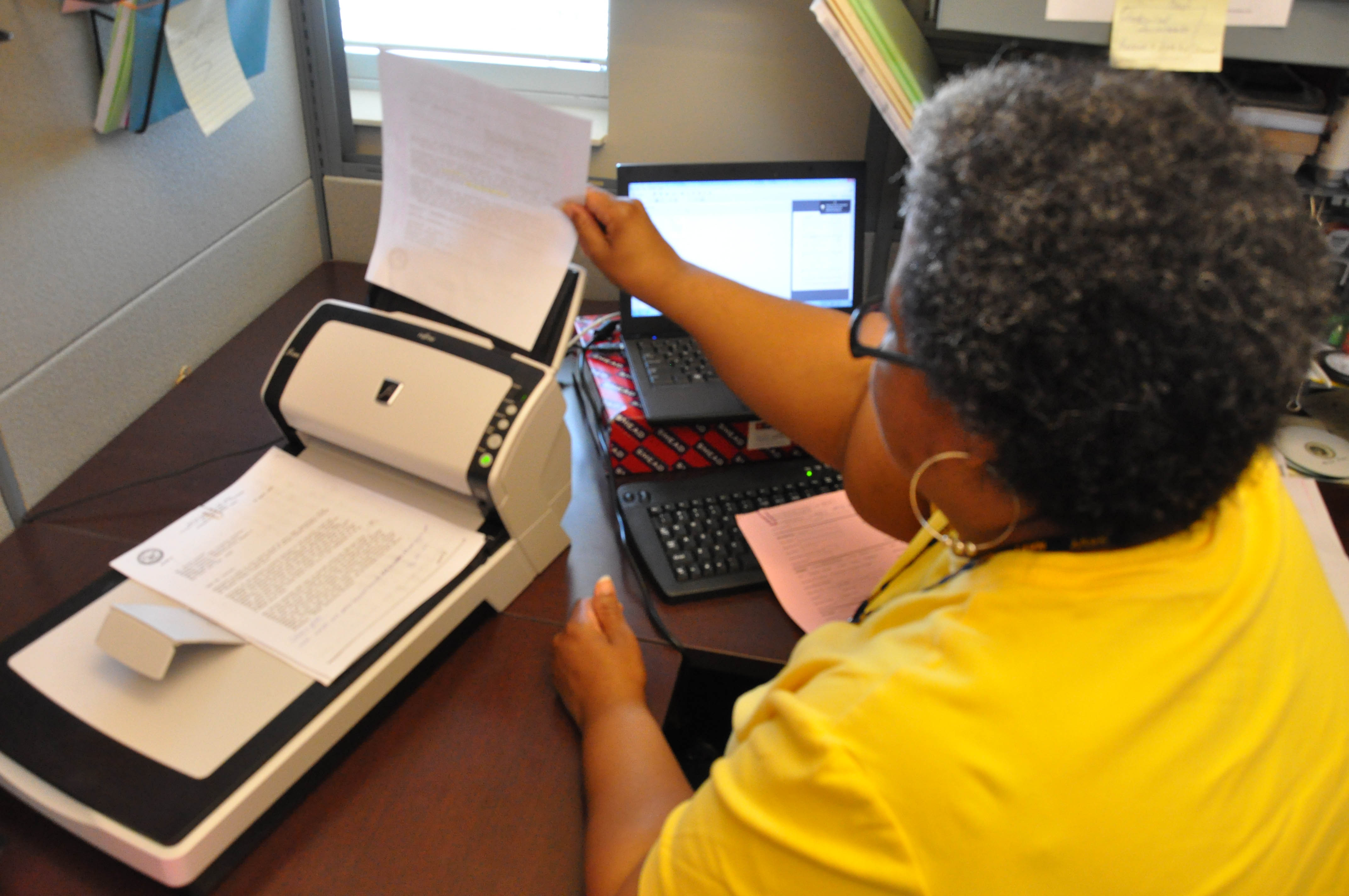
A US defense agent scanning in architectural documents.

Architectural reprography, the reprography of architectural drawings, covers a variety of technologies, media, and supports typically used to make multiple copies of original technical drawings and related records created by architects, landscape architects, engineers, surveyors, mapmakers and other professionals in the building and engineering trades.

Within the context of archival preservation, the custodians of architectural records must consider many aspects of identification and care when managing the artifactual nature of these materials. Storage containers, handling, paper and chemical compositions and interactions, ultraviolet light exposure, humidity, mold, and other agents of potential harm all interact to determine the longevity of these documents. As well, architectural reprographic drawings are often in very large formats, making storage and handling decisions especially complex.

== History ==
With the rise of the professionalized practice of western architecture in the second half of the 19th century, the field of architectural reprography—and the corresponding developments of photography and mass-produced wood-pulp paper—saw significant experiments and advances in technology. Beginning with the discovery of the cyanotype process in 1842, major refinements in blueprinting processes in the 1840s, through the widespread adoption of diazotype printing after World War II, the design profession turned to analog architectural reprography to create accurate, to-scale reproductions of original drawings created on tracing paper, vellum, and linen supports. These copies were typically used throughout the architect's own design process and also for distribution to clients, contractors, governmental agencies, and other interested parties. However, the integration of CAD—or Computer-Aided Design—over the last twenty-five years of design practice has made analog reprography far less common in the profession and more ephemeral in nature. For archivists, curators, librarians and other custodians of architectural records, traditional reprographic formats are now often seen as historic documents, with attendant needs for long-term care and conservation.

== Major processes ==
Both the underlying support—paper or plastic—and the image type are used to identify the specific processes used in architectural reprography. Between the late 19th century and the late 20th century, several processes emerged as the preferred methods, used for decades, while other less common processes were employed for shorter periods of time.

=== Blueprints ===
Also called a cyanotype. Developed in the 1840s by John Herschel, blueprinting uses a wet process to produce an image of white lines on a cyan or Prussian blue ground. To make a blueprint, a heavy paper (or more rarely drafting linen) support is impregnated with potassium ferricyanide and ferric ammonium, placed under a translucent original drawing, weighted with glass, and exposed to ultraviolet light. After sufficient light exposure, the glass and original drawing are removed and the blueprint paper is washed to reveal a negative image. This same process, using an intermediary reprographic drawing, could also be used to produce a positive blueprint—blue lines on a white ground—however, this more expensive and time-intensive method was far less commonly employed.

The major disadvantages of the blueprint process, however, included paper distortions caused by the wet process which might render scale drawings less accurately, as well as the inability to make further copies from the blueprints. Nonetheless, for its efficiency and low cost, the blueprint process, further simplified and mechanized by the turn of the 20th century, became the most widely used reprographic process from the mid-19th century through the first half of the 20th century.

In archival settings, because the process involves ammonium, the resulting prints should not be stored in contact with other papers that have a buffered reserve, nor should blueprints be de-acidified, as the resulting chemical interactions can cause irreversible image loss. Blueprints are also highly light-sensitive and should not be exposed to ultraviolet light for long periods of time.

=== Pellet prints ===
Invented in 1887 by Henry Pellet, the Pellet process uses a wet process to produce an image of cyan or Prussian blue lines on a white ground. Essentially, this process produces a positive image, while a blueprint produces a negative one. To make a Pellet print, a paper (or more rarely drafting linen) support is coated with ferric salts suspended in a gelatin emulsion, placed under a translucent original drawing, weighted with glass, and exposed to ultraviolet light. As with the blueprint process, after sufficient light exposure, the original drawing is removed, the paper is washed in a ferrocyanide bath, and then rinsed in an acidic bath to reveal a positive image. This process required fewer steps than creating a positive blueprint, and was thus more widely employed during the late 19th and early 20th centuries.

In an archival setting, Pellet prints should be treated and stored under the same conditions as blueprints.

=== Van Dyke prints ===
The Van Dyke process, invented by F. R. Van Dyke in 1901, created an intermediary print—a white line on a dark brown ground—that could be used in any of several other processes, such as blueprinting, to create a positive print, i.e. a dark line on a light ground.

Using a translucent vellum support, the paper was prepared with a coating of silver salts. The vellum was then united with the original drawing, exposed to ultraviolet light, and later washed in a sodium thiosulfate bath.

In an archival setting, Van Dyke prints are relatively rare, as they were created for temporary purposes and often discarded after the final positive prints were made. Because of the nitrates used in preparing the paper and the preferred thin paper itself, Van Dyke prints are often extremely brittle and susceptible to damage. Van Dyke prints should be stored separately and, when possible reformatted before the image degrades unacceptably.

=== Diazotypes ===
By the middle of the 20th century, wet-process reprographic techniques such as blueprinting, Pellet, and Van Dyke printing were largely superseded by various dry-printing processes. The most common of these is the diazotype process, refined in the 1920s, which used paper supports sensitized with diazonium salts, a coupling agent, and an acid stabilizer to produce a dark line on a white ground. The Diazo positive print was considered more readable than a negative blueprint, and the dry process eliminated the image distortion of wet paper.

As with other earlier reprographic processes, a translucent original drawing was placed over a sheet of the sensitized paper and exposed to light. However, the next step exposed the paper to an ammonia gas. This alkaline gas catalyzed a reaction between the diazo salts and the coupling agent to produce an image that fixed in the paper over several days. Typically these prints have blue or dark purple lines on a mottled cream-colored background, although line and ground colors can vary.

A related process is the sepia Diazo print, which produced either a positive or negative print in dark brown and light tones. The negative versions of these prints were most often produced as intermediaries, like the earlier Van Dyke process, to allow corrections and revisions without disturbing the original drawing. In the negative printing process, additional resins and oils were sometimes added to the paper support to increase translucency. Positive sepia prints, generally made on opaque paper, were typically used as an alternative to positive blueline Diazo prints.

Both blueline and sepia prints were often poorly and cheaply processed, resulting in undesirable residual chemical content. Off-gassing of sulfurous compounds, image fading, and yellowing of the paper support are common signs of degradation and are not reversible. Diazo prints are also highly light-sensitive and can fade to illegibility within a short period of exposure to ultraviolet light.

In archival practice, Diazo prints are the most common reprographic format encountered in late 20th-century architectural collections. However, their inherent fragility and fugitive images, as compared with blueprints and earlier processes, make their care problematic. Diazos—particularly sepia prints, which readily transfer color to adjacent papers—should be physically segregated from all other types of media. Exposure to light and pollutants in air should be minimized, and wherever possible, original drawings or reformatted prints should be kept for reference.

== Other processes ==
- Hectographic prints
- Ferrogallic prints
- Gel-lithographs
- Photostatic prints
- Wash-Off prints
- Silver halide prints
- Electrostatic prints

== Cleaning, flattening, and repairing ==
For large collections of architectural materials, conservation work can address several areas of concern. Consultation with a professional conservator is recommended, although some minor treatments can be accomplished by general caretakers with training. Rolled and folded reprography, once cleaned, can be flattened through humidification. Cleaning may be done with white vinyl erasers, using great care in areas of friable media, such as graphite and colored pencil. Tears, losses, and other surface damage should be treated by a professional conservator. For particularly fragile or frequently-handled prints, sheets may be encapsulated in polyester or polypropylene film for additional support and protection. This is not recommended, however, for reprographic prints with annotations in friable media.

== Storage ==
=== Rolled storage ===
The most common form of storage for architectural drawings—both for drawings in active professional use and in archival environments—has traditionally been in rolls. While this allows for efficiency in the use of space and ease of retrieval, potentially damaging situations can arise from a casual approach to roll storage. For reprographic drawings on paper supports, rolling can stress paper fibers and make unrolling for examination more difficult. Small rolls can be easily crushed and ends can be creased and torn without additional protective wrapping and support.

=== Flat storage ===
In circumstances where fragile, rigid, or otherwise atypical media makes rolled storage unfeasible, storage in flat boxes or flatfile drawers can be the best choice. Acid-free and lignin-free portfolio boxes, ideally no more than four inches deep, can be cost-effective and allow more flexibility in arrangement on shelving. Flatfile furniture should meet the minimum requirements of archivally-sound construction—powder- or enamel-coated steel units with no rust or sharp edges that could damage materials while stored or moved in and out of the drawers.

Drawings should be grouped and identified for ease in retrieval, preferably within folders that are cut to fit the full dimensions of the corresponding container. As with rolled materials, the potentially damaging chemical interactions of print processes should be considered when grouping drawings in folders. Wherever possible, for example, blueprints should be segregated from diazotypes, and sepia diazo prints should be stored alone to the extent possible.

== Reformatting ==
For most drawings, especially those that are oversized or significantly damaged, photographic reproduction remains the best method of accurately reproducing the fine details of a drawing. For drawings that are not significantly damaged or that are encapsulated in a polyester film, digital flat-bed scanning or other mechanical methods may be used.

== Professional resources ==
The Society of American Archivists supports many architectural archivists in their professional responsibilities. In particular, the SAA's Architectural Records Roundtable is a primary forum for discussion of issues of acquisition, identification, description, conservation, and digital preservation of a wide variety of architectural documentation.
