= Ruling pen =

Drawing instrument

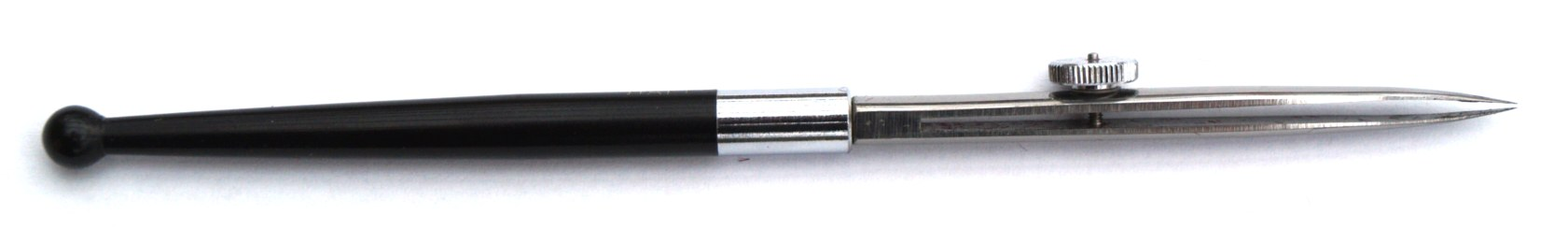
Cartographer's ruling pen

A ruling pen is a drawing instrument for drawing with ink or with other drawing fluids. Originally used for technical drawings in engineering and cartography together with straight rulers and French curves, it is today used for specific uses, such as picture framing or calligraphy. Drafting compasses are also sometimes provided with ruling nibs.

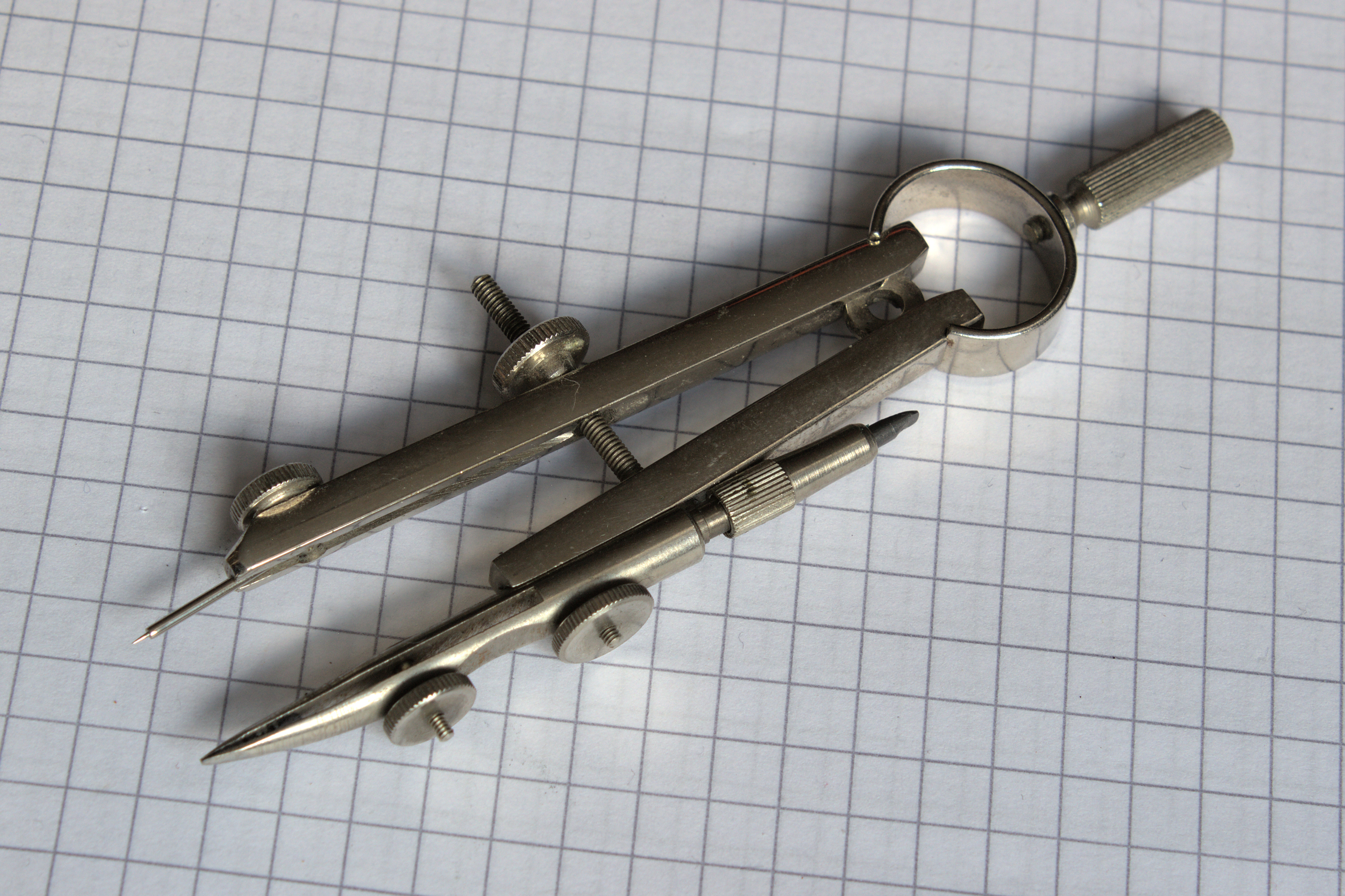
Drafting compass with ruling nib

== Description ==
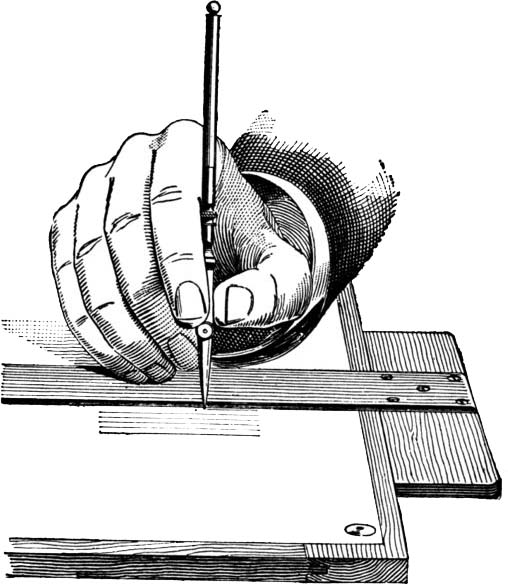
Illustration of ruling pen use from A Textbook on Ornamental Design (1901)

A ruling pen contains ink in a slot between two flexible metal jaws, which are tapered to a point. It enables precise rendering of very thin lines. The line width can be adjusted by an adjustment screw connecting the jaws. The adjustment screw can optionally have a number dial.

== History ==
In the Soviet Union, ruling pens were widely used by women for eyebrow hair removal, being used as tweezers.

== See also ==
- List of pen types, brands and companies
- Technical drawing tools
