= List of office supply companies in the United States =

The following is an incomplete list of office-supply companies in the United States.

== 0–9 ==
- 3M

== A–M ==
- A. B. Dick Company (defunct since 2004)
- A. T. Cross Company
- ACCO Brands
- Alliance Rubber Company
- Avery Dennison
- Blackfeet Indian Writing Company (defunct)
- Bostitch
- Esterbrook (defunct since 1971)
- Eversharp (defunct)
- J. K. Gill Company (defunct since 1999)
- Kardex Group

== N–Z ==
- Office 1 Superstore
- Office Depot
- OfficeMax
- Pendaflex
- Paper Mate
- Parker Pen Company
- Pitney Bowes
- Prime office supply
- Quill Corporation
- ReStockIt
- Sawyer's (defunct)
- Sheaffer
- Standard Adding Machine Company (~1892–1921)
- Staples Inc.
- Swingline
- Victor Technology
- Waterman pens
- W. B. Mason
- Westcott scissors and rulers
- Western Tablet and Stationery Company, Building No. 2 (defunct)

== See also ==
- List of stationery topics
