= Acme United Corporation =

American scissors manufacturer

- Type: Public
- Traded as: AMEX: ACU
- Industry: Consumer products
- Founded: 1867; 159 years ago, in Naugatuck, Connecticut
- Headquarters: Shelton, Connecticut, U.S.
- Key people: Walter C. Johnsen (chairman and CEO); Brian S. Olschan (president and COO); Paul G. Driscoll (vice president and CFO)
- Products: scissors, cutters, knives, rulers, first aid kits
- Revenue: US$191.5 million (2023)
- Net income: US$17.7 million (2023)
- Total assets: ▲US$ 149.2 million (2023)
- Number of employees: 645 (2023)
- Subsidiaries: Westcott, Clauss, PhysiciansCare, Pac-Kit, First Aid Only, DMT, Med-Nap, and Spill Magic
- Website: AcmeUnited.com

Acme United Corporation is an American supplier of cutting, measuring and safety products for the school, home, office, hardware and industrial markets. The company was organized as a partnership in 1867 and incorporated in 1873 under the laws of the State of Connecticut. It is publicly traded on the NYSE American with symbol ACU.

Acme United's operations are in the United States, Canada, Europe (located in Germany) and Asia (located in Hong Kong and China). The operations in the United States, Canada and Europe are primarily involved in product development, manufacturing, marketing, sales, administrative and distribution activities. The operations in Asia consist of sourcing, quality control and sales activities. Net sales for the year ended December 31, 2023 were $191.5 million, compared to $193.9 million in the year ended December 31, 2022, a decrease of 1%. Net income for the year ended December 31, 2023 was $17.8 million, or $4.86 per diluted share, compared to $3,035,000, or $0.86 per diluted share, in 2022.

The company's customers include Staples, Office Depot, OfficeMax, United Stationers, SP Richards, W.B. Mason, Home Depot, Target, Wal-Mart, Walgreens, Grainger, McMaster-Carr, Meijer, Fred Meyer, WH Smith, and many other major chains.

== Etymology ==
Acme (ακμή; English transliteration: akmē) is Ancient Greek for "(highest) point, edge; peak of anything", being used in English with the meaning of "prime" or "the best", initially when referring to a period in someone's life and then extending to anything or anyone who reaches perfection in a certain regard.

== History ==
=== Before 1960s ===
Acme United has roots dating back to 1867 when German immigrant Leo Renz bought an old grist mill in Naugatuck, Connecticut. He opened Renz Shear Shop and started the manufacture of scissors and cast iron shears. In 1873, Leo Renz, along with Robert and Mitchell Renz, and John Peck, officially incorporated their business as The Renz Shear Company.

In the 1880s the Company moved to Bridgeport, Connecticut, where it was incorporated as The Acme Shear Company. A few years later, the company was sold to the brothers David C. Wheeler and Dwight Wheeler, who were responsible for its initial growth. Henry Wheeler, the grandson of David C. Wheeler, became president of Acme Shear in 1941 and again expanded the company in a number of directions. Aided by World War II, Acme Shear became the world's largest maker of shears and scissors by 1946.

=== 1960s and 1970s ===
After the second World War, Acme Shear established a subsidiary in the United Kingdom to sell directly to the European market. It also introduced a line of disposable medical scissors and surgical instruments in 1965. This business became so successful that a new manufacturing plant in Fremont, North Carolina, had to be opened to meet demand. To mark its 100th anniversary, Acme Shear did an initial public offering (IPO) and as such became a publicly traded company in 1967.

In the 1970s, Acme acquired Westcott Rule Company, a major ruler manufacturer, which was founded in 1872 in Seneca Falls, New York. To better reflect the expanded product line, the company name was changed to Acme United Corporation. The 1970s were also highlighted by further expansion in the medical field, with several new acquisitions and products.

Acme United acquired the Canadian business Acme Ruler & Advertising Co out of Toronto, Ontario. This company was established in the 1890s and made rulers, blackboard triangles, protractors, etc. In 1980, the Canadian business's name was changed to Acme Ruler Company and in 1993 to its present name Acme United Limited. From this business unit, Acme United runs its entire Canadian operation.

=== 1980s ===
Despite continued growth during the 1960s and 1970s, Acme United faced rough times during the 1980s because it became too dependent on one medical tools customer, American Hospital Supply. When this company started manufacturing products itself, Acme lost over $20 million in annual sales. In a struggle to survive, it took over several companies in the US and abroad, however with varying success.

=== 1990s ===
During the early 1990s Acme United continued to suffer losses, which was reflected in the company's share price. The stock, which had been trading around $25 in the 1980s, now sold for only $3, leading to strong shareholder pressure to implement significant management changes.

Walter C. Johnsen joined the company early 1995 as a board member and became CEO later that same year. He had previously been vice chairman and a principal of Marshall Products, Inc., a medical supply distributor that he and a partner acquired in a leveraged buyout. Marshall had been purchased by Omron Corporation, to become the North American arm of its medical business.

In the following years, Johnsen recruited a new management team, sold the medical business to Medical Action Industries and closed seven manufacturing plants. Brian Olschan joined as senior vice president of sales and marketing, and later became chief operating officer.

By focusing on higher margin products such as student scissors, rulers and staplers, Acme United returned to profitability in 2000 when it reported a net income of $1.1 million. Additionally, it penetrated the office market by selling products to mass merchants such as Wal-Mart and Target.

=== 2000s ===
With financial results again improving, Acme United acquired Clauss Cutlery from Alco Industries in June 2004. Clauss, founded in 1877 in Fremont, Ohio, manufactured scissors and cutting tools for the floral and industrial markets. By 2004, Acme United's sales had risen to $43.4 million with earnings reaching $3.2 million.

In 2007, the company bought the brand names and intellectual property of Camillus Cutlery Company, one of the oldest knife manufacturers in the United States, for $200,000 in a bankruptcy auction.

In February 2011, Acme United acquired Pac-Kit Safety Equipment Company, a manufacturer of first aid kits for the industrial, safety, transportation and marine markets. The company purchased the accounts receivable, inventory, equipment, brands, historical records, and photographs for $3.4 million. Pac-Kit's revenues in 2010 were approximately $5.4 million.

And Acme United continued on its acquisition path. In June 2012, it acquired certain assets of The C-Thru Ruler Company, a well-known supplier of drafting, measuring, lettering and stencil products. Acme United purchased the inventory, tooling, brands, and other intellectual property for approximately $1.47 million. In 2011, C-Thru's revenues were about $2.5 million with gross profits reaching roughly $1 million. After Acme United acquired C-Thru Ruler Company in 2012, its products were integrated into the Westcott products family. So, the identity of C-Thru in many cases has become Westcott.

Late August 2013, Acme United purchased a 340,000 square feet manufacturing and distribution center in Rocky Mount, North Carolina, for $2.8 million. Before that, the company had two distribution centers, which, combined, were only half the size of the new one. The lease for one warehouse was terminated, and the second warehouse, in Fremont, North Carolina, was sold by Acme on April 7, 2014, for $850,000.

Because Acme United's first aid business showed strong growth in the industrial safety market and office channel, it acquired First Aid Only Inc., a supplier of first aid kits, refills, and safety products for $13.8 million in June 2014. In 2013, First Aid Only reached revenues of $17.4 million and operating income of $1.1 million.

Also in 2014, Acme United launched an entire line of fishing knives and tools under the new brand Cuda. About 30 tools, specifically designed for inshore and offshore fishing, were introduced at the International Convention of Allied Sportfishing Trades (ICAST), the largest sportfishing trade show in the world. At ICAST 2015, twenty additional tools for freshwater fishing were shown to the public for the first time. The market for freshwater tools is more than double the size of the salt water market.

In 2014 Acme United achieved record net sales and earnings. For the first time in the company's history, annual sales reached more than $100 million.

On February 1, 2016, Acme United acquired Diamond Machining Technology (DMT), a Marlborough, Massachusetts-based manufacturer of sharpening tools for knives, scissors, chisels and other cutting tools. Acme United paid $7.0 million in cash. DMT had revenues in 2015 of $5.4 million and EBITDA of approximately $1.0 million.

Exactly one year later, Acme United acquired Spill Magic Inc. for $7.2 million in cash. Spill Magic is a manufacturer of Spill Magic absorbents and related products that are used to prevent slip & fall accidents. Spill Magic had revenues in 2016 of $6.3 million and EBITDA of approximately $1.4 million.

On January 7, 2020, the Company purchased the assets of First Aid Central, located in Laval, Quebec, Canada. First Aid Central produces and sells a complete line of first aid kits, refills, and safety products to a broad range of industries and end users. Its products meet federal Health Canada and provincial regulatory requirements. The Company purchased the First Aid Central assets for $2.1 million in cash.

In December 2020, Acme United also acquired the assets of Med-Nap LLC., a Brooksville, Florida-based manufacturer of alcohol prep pads, alcohol wipes, benzalkonium chloride wipes, antiseptic wipes, and other first aid products. Med-Nap has an FDA-registered manufacturing facility where it produces all of its products.

In June 2022, Acme United acquired Safety Made, a manufacturer of first aid kits for the promotional products industry. Based in Keene, New Hampshire, Safety Made had revenues in 2021 of approximately $4.9 million and EBITDA of approximately $1.2 million. The company employs 24 people.

Only five months later, Ready 4 Kits was acquired. Founded in 1996, and also based in New Hampshire, Ready 4 Kits custom designs logoed and imprinted first aid kits for promotional use across a number of categories and themes, including automotive, golf, disaster/survival, eco-friendly, health and wellness, outdoor and trade show/travel.

Late September 2023, Acme United acquired Hawktree Solutions, Inc., a supplier of first aid and survival kits, medical supplies, and training. Based in Laval, Canada Hawktree’s annual revenues in prior years averaged approximately $4.0 million. The Company was in receivership and the purchase price was approximately $1.0 million.

On November 1st, 2023, Acme United sold its Camillus and Cuda hunting and fishing product lines to GSM Holdings, Inc for $19.8 million.

== Corporate structure ==
Today, Acme United has nine main brands: Westcott, Clauss, PhysiciansCare, Pac-Kit, First Aid Only, Med-Nap, DMT, Spill Magic and Safety Made.

=== Westcott ===
Westcott is a major brand for scissors and rulers in North America. Their scissors range from kids and student products to sewing, office, and craft items. Their rulers come in wood, plastic, stainless steel, acrylic and aluminum with several different designs available. Each year, Acme sells between 60 and 80 million scissors, and 15 to 18 million Westcott rulers.

Following the success in scissors and rulers, Westcott extended its product line with other office tools such as paper trimmers, pencil sharpeners, math kits, etc.

=== Clauss ===
Clauss primarily manufactures cutting instruments for professionals in the hardware & industrial, lawn & garden, food processing, sewing and housewares markets. These products include True Professional sewing shears, utility knives, chef shears, hobby knives and craft implements. Also, in 2013 Clauss launched a family of titanium bonded non-stick putty knives.

=== PhysiciansCare ===
PhysiciansCare offers a broad assortment of first aid kits, emergency and disaster kits, preparedness products and kit refills. PhysiciansCare also carries a branded line of over-the-counter medicines, including the ingredients aspirin, acetaminophen and Ibuprofen.

=== Pac-Kit ===
Pac-Kit sells first aid kits, industrial stations and refills, emergency medical travel and recreational kits to the industrial, safety, transportation and marine markets. The brands has roots dating back to the 1800s as part of the Burroughs Wellcome Company. It was one of the first companies that began packaging medications and dressings into cases for use in the field. Many explorers of that time carried the cases with them on their expeditions. Captain Robert Scott used it on his expedition to the South Pole, Admiral Byrd carried them on the first flight to the South Pole, Admiral Peary brought Pac-Kit first aid kits on both his North and South Pole flights and Nobel Prize winner Fridtjof Nansen had a Pac-Kit on his polar expeditions.

=== First Aid Only ===
First Aid Only was founded in 1988 and pioneered consultative selling and support of first aid items to large corporate customers.

It operates out of a modern 54,000 square-foot facility in Vancouver, Washington, where well over 100 people are employed. All of First Aid Only's first aid kits continue to be produced in the United States.

First Aid Only is especially known for its SmartCompliance kits. Most businesses are federally mandated to have first aid solutions that are compliant with OSHA as well as ANSI standards. These SmartCompliance first aid supply cabinets ensure that a business is covered. First Aid Only has a distributor network of more than 1,000 people and supplies first aid goods to well-known businesses such as McDonald's, Grainger and Staples.

=== Med-Nap ===
Med-Nap was founded in 2007 and currently employs 25 people. It sells its products directly to first aid suppliers and major retailers under private label and Med-Nap brands. For 2020, Med-Nap was estimated to reach revenues of $4.9 million and EBITDA of $1.0 million.

=== DMT ===
Diamond Machining Technology was established in 1976, as a manufacturer of large diamond grinding and polishing wheels for industrial applications.

Due to increased overseas competition, DMT looked for ways to diversify its business. After much testing and development work, a prototype sharpener was developed, which the engineers at DMT then refined to an unbreakable, clean-cutting diamond honing tool.

The first polka dot diamond bench stones were soon thereafter shipped to customers such as Brookstone for use in the woodworking area and Bloomingdale's for use in the kitchen. The new sharpener quickly found its way to other sectors as well, such as the automotive, marine, and aviation industries.

Today, DMT products are sold in dozens of countries all over the world. In addition, the company holds more than ten patents and has introduced over 125 different products. It sells many tens of thousands of items each year to DIYers, gardening and outdoor enthusiasts, woodworkers, hunters, fishermen, and military and law enforcement personnel.

=== Spill Magic ===
Spill Magic, Inc. was founded by David Wampler in March 1995. It sells absorbents as a safety product to prevent slip and fall accidents. These absorbents encapsulate food and other slippery spills into a dry powder that can be safely disposed. The Spill Magic products are used throughout the U.S. in national and regional grocery, retail, big box and other retail stores.

The company's main office is located in Santa Ana, CA (about 30 miles south of Los Angeles). This 30,000 square foot facility is the headquarters for its administration, sales, customer service, production, shipping and receiving for the Western U.S. and Pacific Rim. In addition, Spill Magic has a facility in Smyrna, TN (about 20 miles south of Nashville) that provides manufacturing and fulfillment for the Central and Eastern U.S.

In 2018, the Spill Magic line was launched in Europe under the Easy Absorb brand name.

=== Safety Made ===
Safety Made was founded in 2014, and is a manufacturer of first aid kits, as well as the exclusive source for Dorcy, Life Gear and DieHard flashlights, in the promotional products industry. Basically, Safety Made sources a wide variety of products, assembles them and then screen-prints a company’s name or logo on the products. Companies use promotional products, like safety kits, to build brand awareness, make clients aware of a rebranding, hand out at an event or conference, or simply launch a marketing campaign.

== Competition ==
Acme United competes with many companies in each market and geographic area. For example, the major competitors in the cutting category are 3M and Fiskars Corporation. The major competitors in the measuring category are Maped and Staedtler. The major competitor in the pencil sharpener category is Bostitch. The major competitor in the safety category is Johnson & Johnson.

== Key directors ==
=== Walter Johnsen – chairman and CEO ===
Mr. Johnsen has served as director since 1995 and as chairman and chief executive officer since November 30, 1995. Before joining the company he was vice chairman and a principal of Marshall Products, Inc., a medical supply distributor.

=== Brian Olschan – president and COO ===
Mr. Olschan served as senior vice president of sales and marketing from September 10, 1996, until February 22, 1999. On January 23, 1999, he was promoted to president and chief operating officer. From 1984 to 1996, he was employed by General Cable Corporation in various executive positions.

=== Paul Driscoll – vice president and CFO ===
Mr. Driscoll has served as vice president and chief financial officer, secretary and treasurer since October 2002. Mr. Driscoll joined Acme as director of international finance in 2001. From 1997 to 2001 he was employed by Ernest and Julio Gallo Winery, including two years in Japan as director of finance and operations. Prior to Gallo he served in several increasingly responsible positions in Sterling Winthrop Inc. in New York City and Sanofi S.A. in France.

== See also ==
- Clauss Cutlery Company
- Pac-Kit First Aid Kits
- Westcott Rule Company
- C-Thru Ruler
