= C-Thru Ruler =

American office products manufacturer

- Industry: School and Office products manufacturer
- Owner: Acme United Corporation
- Website: C-Thru Ruler Home

The C-Thru Ruler Company is an American maker of measuring devices and specialized products for drafting, designing and drawing. The company was formed in 1939 in Bloomfield, Connecticut, by Jennie R. Zachs, a schoolteacher, who saw the need for transparent measuring tools such as rulers, triangles, curves and protractors.

During the 1990s, the company expanded into the paper crafting and scrapbooking fields under the Little Yellow Bicycle and Déjà Views brands.

In June 2012, Acme United Corporation bought the ruler, lettering and drafting portions of C-Thru Ruler. The scrap booking part of the business, continues to be managed by the Zachs family under the Little Yellow Bicycle Inc. name.

== History ==
=== Jennie Zachs ===
Jennie R. Zachs, born in 1898, was the daughter of Benjamin and Julia Zachs who emigrated from Russia to the United States in the early 1900s. She graduated from high school in Hartford, CT. A few years later, she graduated from college and became a schoolteacher.

While teaching, she developed the idea that when students would be able to see through their rulers, it would make the tool much more useful in the classroom. As a result, Ms. Zachs started the development of two transparent rulers made out of plastic.

In 1939, she founded C-Thru Ruler Company in Bloomfield, Connecticut and designed a whole family of transparent measuring tools like rulers, triangles, curves and protractors. Shortly after, she engaged a supplier to mill the tools out of plastic sheet and began to attend different trade shows and conventions for blue printers and art materials dealers to sell the products. She noticed that the transparent measuring tools could effectively replace wood and metal measuring devices for many applications in drafting, designing and drawing.

=== 1940–1969 ===
Only one year after founding the company, Jennie Zachs took in two partners to handle the expansion of C-Thru. Edward Zachs, her brother, joined C-Thru and Anna Zachs, her sister, became an investor. On October 14, 1946, C-Thru Ruler Company was formally incorporated in Connecticut.

In 1957, Edward’s son, Ted also started working at the Company. The following years, sales representatives were hired and the products line was significantly expanded through a distribution arrangement with Letraset, a manufacturer of dry transfer, rub on lettering and lettering tapes.

=== 1970–1989 ===
In 1970, Letraset decided to start selling its own line of transparent tools. In response thereto, C-Thru acquired a small manufacturer of dry transfer lettering products and started offering its own line of vinyl lettering. One year later, Ted Zachs bought out the other family members and became the sole shareholder of C-Thru.

In 1983, Jed Zachs, the son of Ted, joined the business and in 1985 another small acquisition was completed, which expanded the line of adhesive backed vinyl letters and stencils for signage purposes.

=== 1990–2012 ===
In 1993, Ross Zachs, Ted Zachs’ younger son also became part of the company. Jed oversaw manufacturing and related operations, while Ross played a key role in the creative and marketing sides of the business.

The following year, C-Thru’s owners saw that scrapbooking was growing rapidly and decided to enter that market with a line of stencils, templates and rulers. In the same year, it also created the Deja Views brand and began to sell to hobby and craft dealers, primarily small independent stores and a few chains, including Michaels, which only had a handful of stores at that time.

To expand the design and paper crafting business, a new brand called Little Yellow Bicycle was launched in 2008 with a differentiated line for independent retailers.

In June 2012, the non-scrapbooking part of the business was sold to Acme United Corporation. Acme United purchased the inventory, tooling, brands, and other intellectual property for approximately $1.47 million. In 2011, revenues for the C-Thru Ruler part of the business reached about $2.7 million.

The Zachs family continued to focus on the design and paper crafting business under the Little Yellow Bicycle Inc. name with Ted Zachs as president.

== C-Thru Ruler as Acme United Brand ==
After the acquisition, the C-Thru products were gradually integrated into Acme United’s Westcott product family, which mainly consists of rulers, scissors and other school and office products. So, the identity of C-Thru in most cases has become Westcott.
