= Westcott Rule Company =

Westcott
- Industry: School and Office products
- Owner: Acme United Corporation
- Website: https://www.westcottbrand.com/

Westcott Rule Company, more commonly known as just Westcott is a school and office products brand. It was founded in 1872 by Henry Westcott, and with his two sons Charles and Frank Westcott, started manufacturing wooden furniture used by printers and trellis units in Seneca Falls, New York. The company expanded rapidly and became one of the largest manufacturers of desk and school rulers in the world. Throughout its history it remained in Westcott family hands until it was purchased by Acme Shear Co. in 1968, which later changed its name to Acme United Corporation.

Following its acquisition of the Westcott brand, Acme United started selling dozens of other school and office items, such as scissors, pencil sharpeners and paper trimmers under the Westcott name. As of 2008, Westcott sells 60 to 80 million scissors and 15 to 18 million rulers worldwide annually.

== History ==
=== 1808–1871 ===
Henry Westcott was born in Newport, Rhode Island, in 1808 where he learned the sash and blind makers' trade. Later, he started his own company together with his brother Edwin and an associate called Hiram Miller to manufacture sash, doors and blinds. After retiring from this business, he moved to Seneca Falls in 1847 to embark in the manufacture of an improved churn and butter pail on which he had secured patents. Also this business proved to be a success, mainly because Henry Westcott invented and built machinery to make the wooden products he sold, while competitors were still making them by hand. In 1868, at the age of 60, he sold his interest in this company.

=== 1872–1893 ===
In 1872 Henry, along with his two sons Charles and Frank, established the firm Westcott Brothers to manufacture a variety of wood specialties. While Charles concentrated on operating the factory and Frank on selling the products, here too, Henry's experience and inventive genius were responsible for the company's growth. When Henry retired in 1890, the company was renamed to Westcott Bros. Co. and expanded into numerous products like toy blocks and other games.

=== 1894–1920 ===
The Westcott-Jewell factory. Only showing the main building.

When C. E. and M. R. Jewell joined the business in 1894 it was renamed to Westcott-Jewell Company. At first, the company continued to manufacture a wide variety of products like bicycle-holders, stands and hangers, but they quickly started concentrating on rulers, made in all sizes and finishes, both for office use and for advertising purposes. This marked the start of a flourishing period for the company.

At the beginning of the 20th century, the Westcott-Jewell Co. employed about a hundred people and its plant was one of the largest of its kind in the United States with a total floor space of 45,000 square feet (4,200 m^{2}). By that time, their products were shipped to all parts of the United States and exported to many different countries.

In February 1907, disaster struck as a big fire destroyed part of the factory. Although the building was equipped with a, for those days, modern sprinkler system, damages ran up to $10,000. Luckily, the loss on building and stock was covered by insurance.

In 1920, the company again changed its name from Westcott-Jewell Company to Westcott Rule Company.

=== 1921–1968 ===
During and after World War II the company continued to produce thousands of rulers and other measuring instruments.

After remaining in family hands for 96 years, the Westcott Rule Co. was sold in 1968 to Acme Shear Company of Bridgeport, Connecticut, which was a manufacturer of shears and medical equipment. The company's 55 employees could hold their jobs and the products continued to be sold under the Westcott brand.

=== 1969–Present ===
Acme Shear changed its name to Acme United Corporation in 1971 to better reflect its diversified product mix. When hard times befell Acme United in the mid-1990s, the company decided to sell the old Westcott factory and move its production to the lower cost and more efficient facility in North Carolina.

Westcott had become a well-known brand and so Acme United started using the name on a wide variety of such school and office products as trimmers, pencil sharpeners, erasers, and mathematical and craft tools.

Westcott continues to bring new products to the market. In 2016, for example, new scissors for children, named Ergo Jr, were launched. These are the first and only scissors developed in co-operation with the United States Ergonomics organization.

More recently, it launched a set of glue guns for the craft and DIY markets. These guns have non-stick internal mechanisms so that the glue does not clog the machines. Also, the tips of the guns have non-stick color-changing coatings. That way, when the tip of the gun is hot, it turns red and users know not to touch it. When it is red, it is also ready to dispense the glue. And when the tip is cool, it is blue.

== Main products today ==
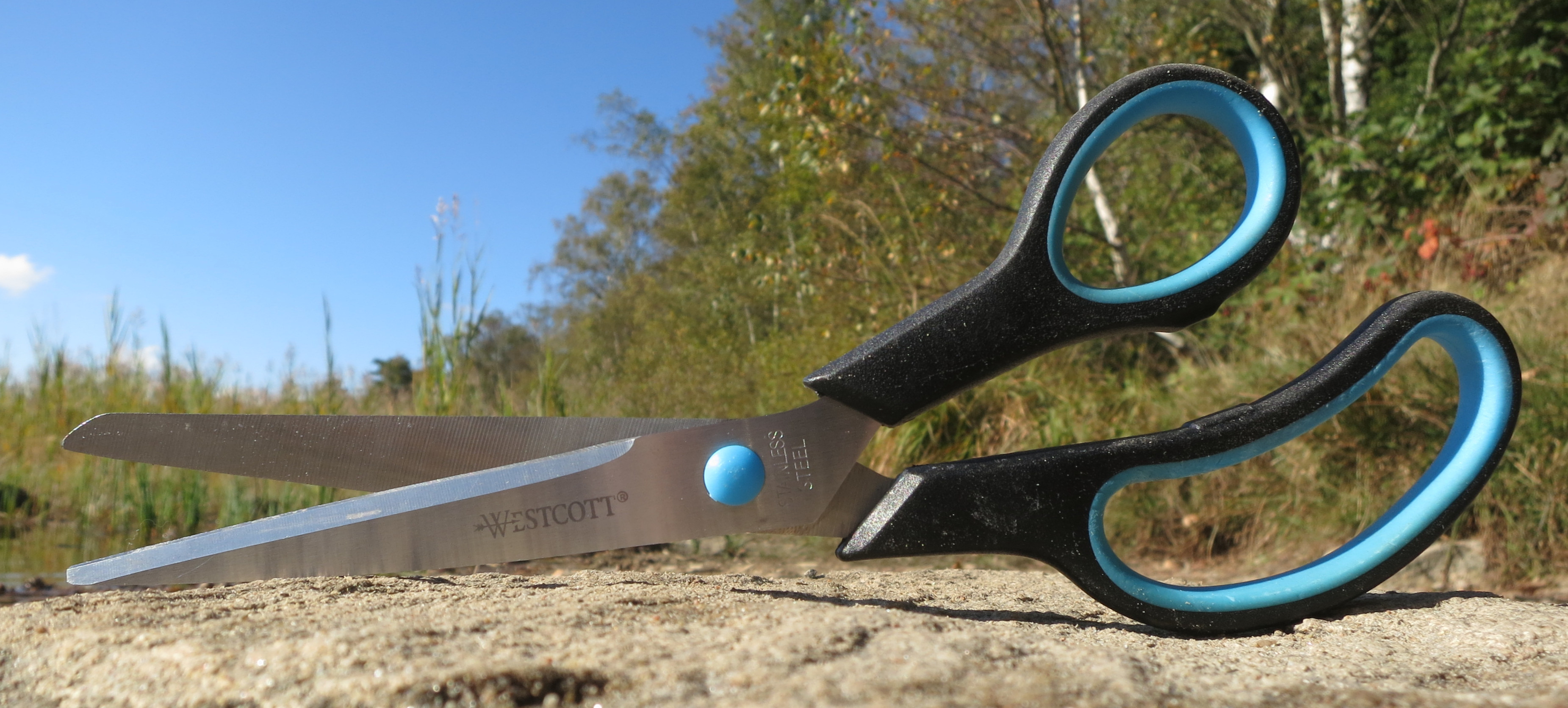
Westcott scissors from 2020

Although Westcott manufactures everyday products, the brand tries to stay one step ahead by improving the materials it uses, such as titanium coated blades or blades with a non-stick coating. Other products have Microban antimicrobial protection to prevent the growth of bacteria on the surface.

=== Scissors ===
Westcott sells a wide assortment of scissors. Starting from regular, everyday scissors to scissors with titanium coated blades or non-stick coated blades to use in areas where much glue and paste are used.

=== iPoint pencil sharpener ===
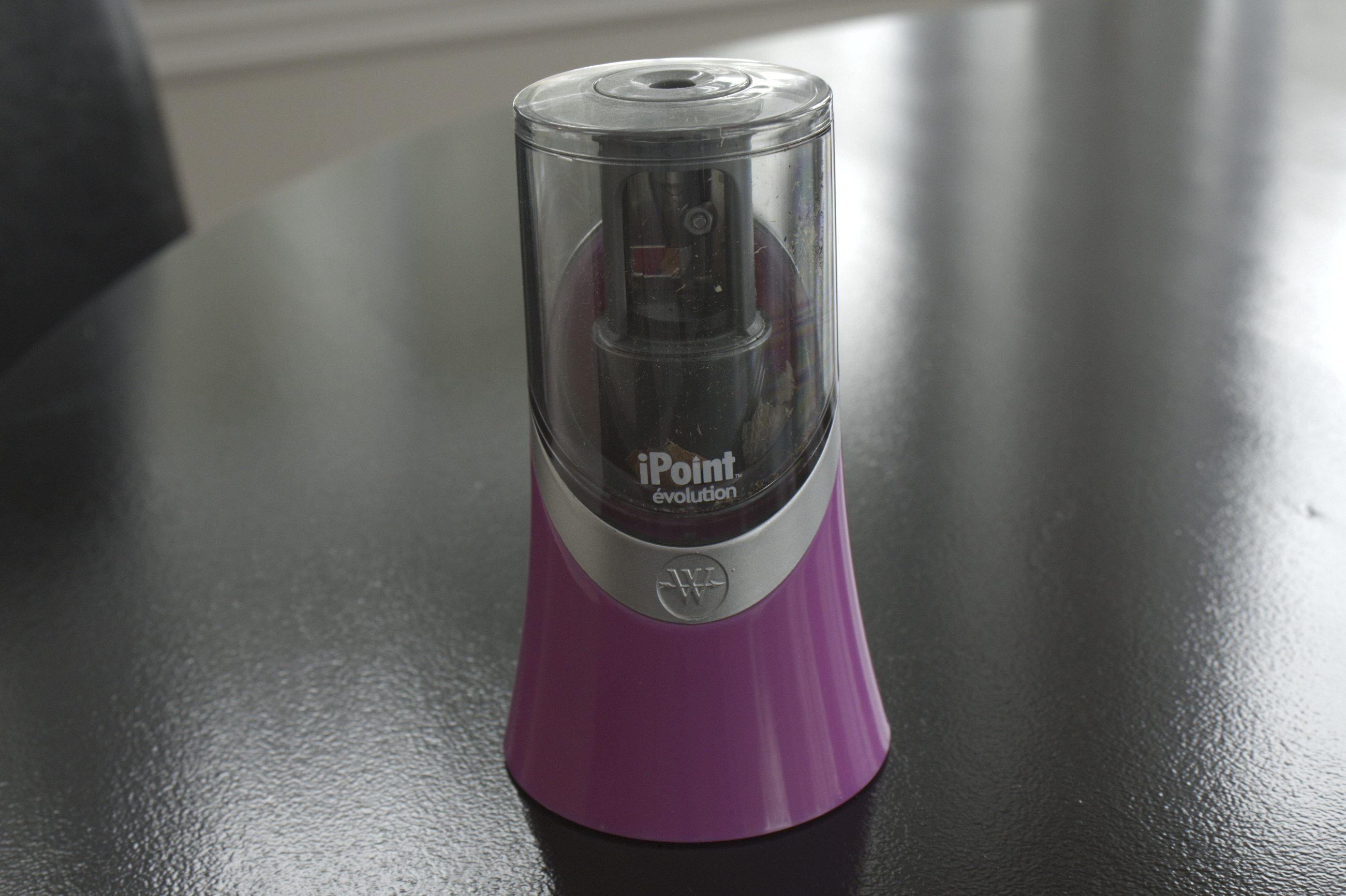
A pink Westcott iPoint Evolution pencil sharpener

Westcott is also known for its line of iPoint electric pencil sharpeners. The original iPoint, the iPoint Evolution, and the iPoint Orbit all won a Good Design Award from the Chicago Athenaeum, Museum of Architecture and Design in the office products category. It is one of Acme United's best selling products. In 2013, for example, the sharpener's revenues reached about $11 million.

=== Rulers ===
Westcott sells rulers in wood, plastic, stainless steel and aluminum. Next to regular rulers, the company also manufactures Twist-It flexible rulers that cannot be broken and rulers with Microban, an ingredient that inhibits the growth of bacteria.

=== Other ===
Other main Westcott products include TrimAir paper trimmers, drafting and measuring tools, erasers, math tools, stencils, and vinyl lettering.

== Competitors ==
The major competitor in the cutting category is Fiskars Corporation. The major competitor in the measuring category is Helix International Ltd.
