= Helix (stationery company) =

- Type: Public
- Industry: Stationery
- Founded: 1887
- Headquarters: Kings Heath, West Midlands, United Kingdom
- Area served: Worldwide
- Products: Oxford
- Parent: Maped
- Website: Helix

Helix (also known as Helix Oxford or Maped Helix) is a United Kingdom-based manufacturer of stationery. It exports to over 65 countries, with offices in Hong Kong and US, and has its UK headquarters in Kingswinford in the West Midlands.

== History ==
=== Establishment ===
Helix was established in 1887 under the name 'The Universal Woodworking Company Ltd.'; it manufactured wooden rulers and metal laboratory apparatus. In 1894, it patented the drawing compass and, with it, launched the Helix brand, following on from the initial success of the compass and rule. In 1912, the company's first mathematical set was created; and, in 1935, the brand "Helix Oxford" was launched. In 1955 the company was renamed the Helix Universal Company, and moved its headquarters to Lye, Worcestershire. In the 1960s, the name was changed to Helix International Ltd.

=== Administration ===
In 2004, the company's factory in Lye ceased production. In January 2012, the company entered administration. On 8 February 2012 the company stated, "The joint administrators from Grant Thornton UK LLP are currently speaking to a number of interested parties and have received offers for the sale of the business as a going concern." One week later, the company was bought by the French Maped group.

=== Maped Helix ===
When Helix joined the Maped Helix Group the company changed its name to Helix Trading Ltd and moved its UK headquarters from Lye, West Midlands to nearby Kingswinford, where it has its showroom. In 2014 it reported sales of £8.5 million.

== Oxford Set of Mathematical Instruments ==
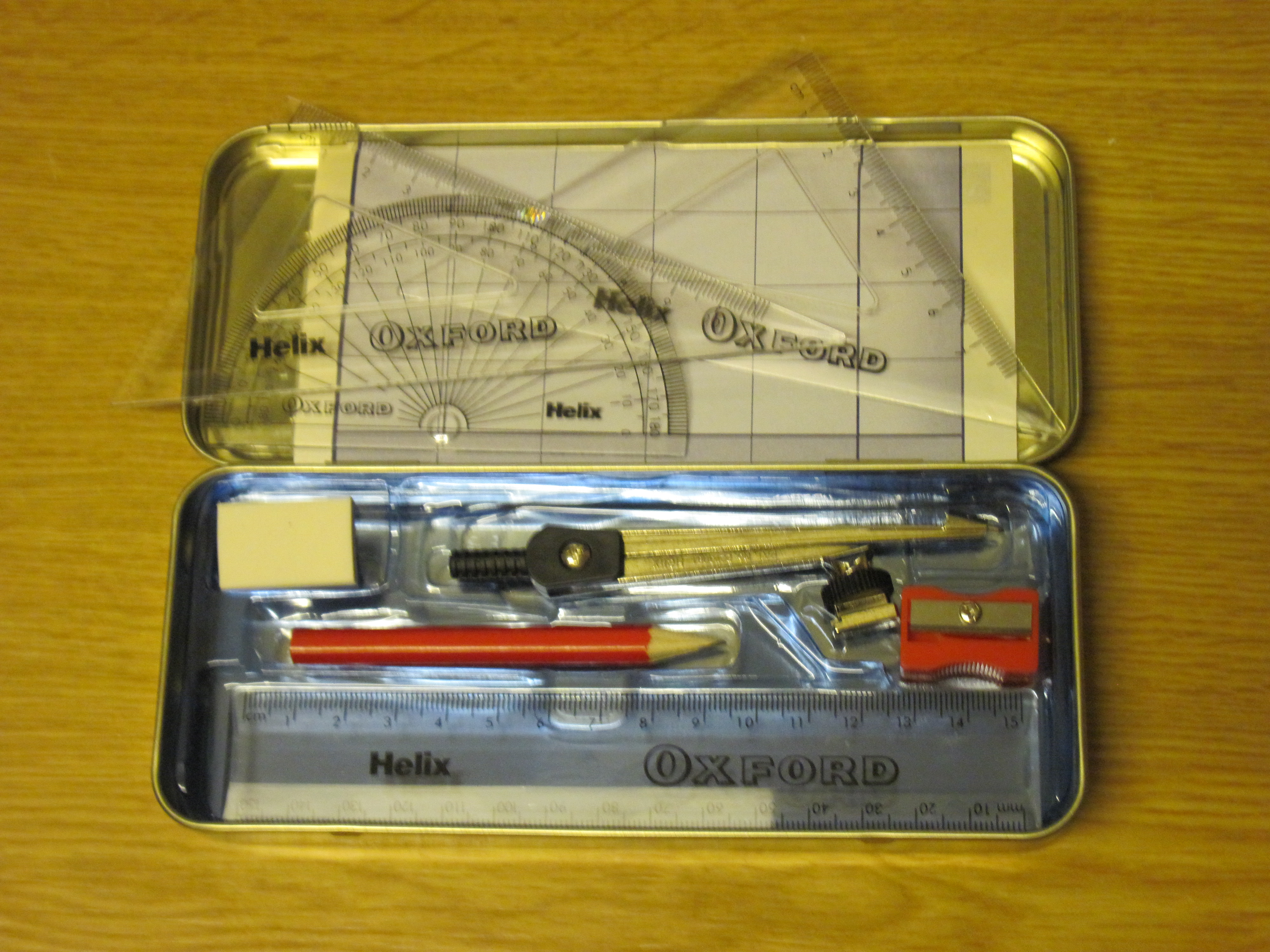
Contents of the Oxford Set of Mathematical Instruments in 2011

The Oxford Set of Mathematical Instruments is a set of instruments used by generations of school children in the United Kingdom and around the world in mathematics and geometry lessons. The set is marketed in over 100 countries by Helix.

It consists of a metal tin embossed on the front with a drawing of Balliol College and the words 'THE HELIX OXFORD SET OF MATHEMATICAL INSTRUMENTS COMPLETE & ACCURATE' in white against a blue background.

Inside the tin there are two set squares, a 180° protractor, a 15 cm ruler, a metal compass, a 9 cm pencil, a pencil sharpener, and an eraser. (In the 1970s a stencil for drawing chemical apparatus was included.) There is also a fact sheet and glossary of mathematical terms with a school timetable printed on the back. The export version also includes dividers.
