= Steel rule =

Steel rule may prefer to:

- Steel rule die, a die made using a material called die steel
- A ruler made using steel)
