= Lesbian rule =

Flexible strip of lead for use in molding

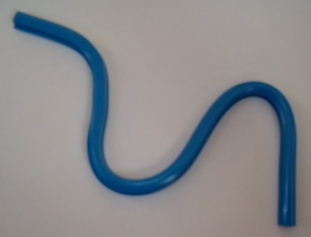
A flexible curve: the modern counterpart of a lesbian rule

A Lesbian rule was historically a flexible mason's rule made of lead that could be bent to the curves of a molding, and used to measure or reproduce irregular curves. Lesbian rules were originally constructed of a pliable kind of lead found on the island of Lesbos. It is from the island that the ruler gets its name.

== Figurative allusions ==
The rule is alluded to by Aristotle in his Nicomachean Ethics (book V, chapter 14) as a metaphor for the importance of flexibility in equitable justice:

For what is itself indefinite can only be measured by an indefinite standard, like the leaden rule used by Lesbian builders; just as that rule is not rigid but can be bent to the shape of the stone, so a special ordinance is made to fit the circumstances of the case.

In the early modern period, the term was often used figuratively (as Aristotle had used it) to mean a pliant, flexible and accommodating principle of judgment – sometimes with overtones that were positive, but on other occasions in a more pejorative sense. In his famous letter to the Louvain theologian Martin Dorp, Thomas More referenced it when reproving Dorp for his attack on Erasmus' In Praise of Folly: "You praise Adriaan for being unbiased, yet you seem to suggest he is no more unbiased than a Lesbian rule, a rule made out of lead which, as Aristotle reminds us, is not always unbiased, since it bends to fit uneven shapes." Samuel Daniel in 1603 described equity as "that Lesbian square, that building fit, Plies to the worke, not forc'th the worke to it".

Emblem by Petrus Costalius [Pierre Coustau] of a mason using a lesbian rule, 1555

In 1555, the term in normam lesbiam, "by the Lesbian rule", was the subject of an emblem in Pierre Coustau's Pegma cum narrationibus philosophicis. The inscription for the emblem reads:

Look at how the turned Lesbian rule,
Conforms itself in all directions to the work.
Often the meaning of a written law hides within-
Which is usually entirely in the hand of the judge.
He must vary [the rule] according to the shape of shifting things,
Not always follow one and the same way.

In the later 17th century, the antiquary John Aubrey used the metaphor to imply the distortion of evidence to fit a preconceived theory. He accused Inigo Jones, who had interpreted Stonehenge as a Roman monument, of having "made a Lesbians rule, which is conformed to the stone: that is, he framed the Monument to his own Hypothesis, which is much differing from the Thing it self".

In Giambattista Vico's 1708 oration De nostri temporis studiorum ratione, a contribution to the evolving public debate about the advantages and disadvantages of the early modern academic system compared to that of the classical period (the "Quarrel of the Ancients and the Moderns"), Vico invokes the notion of the Lesbian rule to describe what is lacking in the modern system's intense focus on the mechanistic precision of the developing natural sciences:

Since, then, the course of action in life must consider the importance of the single events and their circumstances, it may happen that many of these circumstances are extraneous and trivial, some of them bad, some even contrary to one's goal. It is therefore impossible to assess human affairs by the inflexible standard of abstract right; we must rather gauge them by the pliant Lesbic rule, which does not conform bodies to itself, but adjusts itself to their contours.

In the 19th century, John Henry Newman invokes the Lesbian rule in the introduction to Part I (section 15) of his Essay on the Development of Christian Doctrine (1845).

== See also ==
- Flat spline – Long flexible batten used to produce a fair curve through a set of points
- French curve – Template made from metal, wood or plastic composed of segments of smooth curves
- Profile gauge – Tool for recording the cross-sectional shape of a surface
