= Maped =

French stationery company

Maped SAS
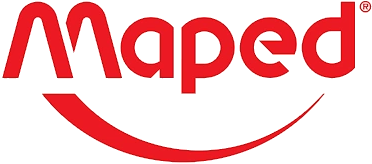

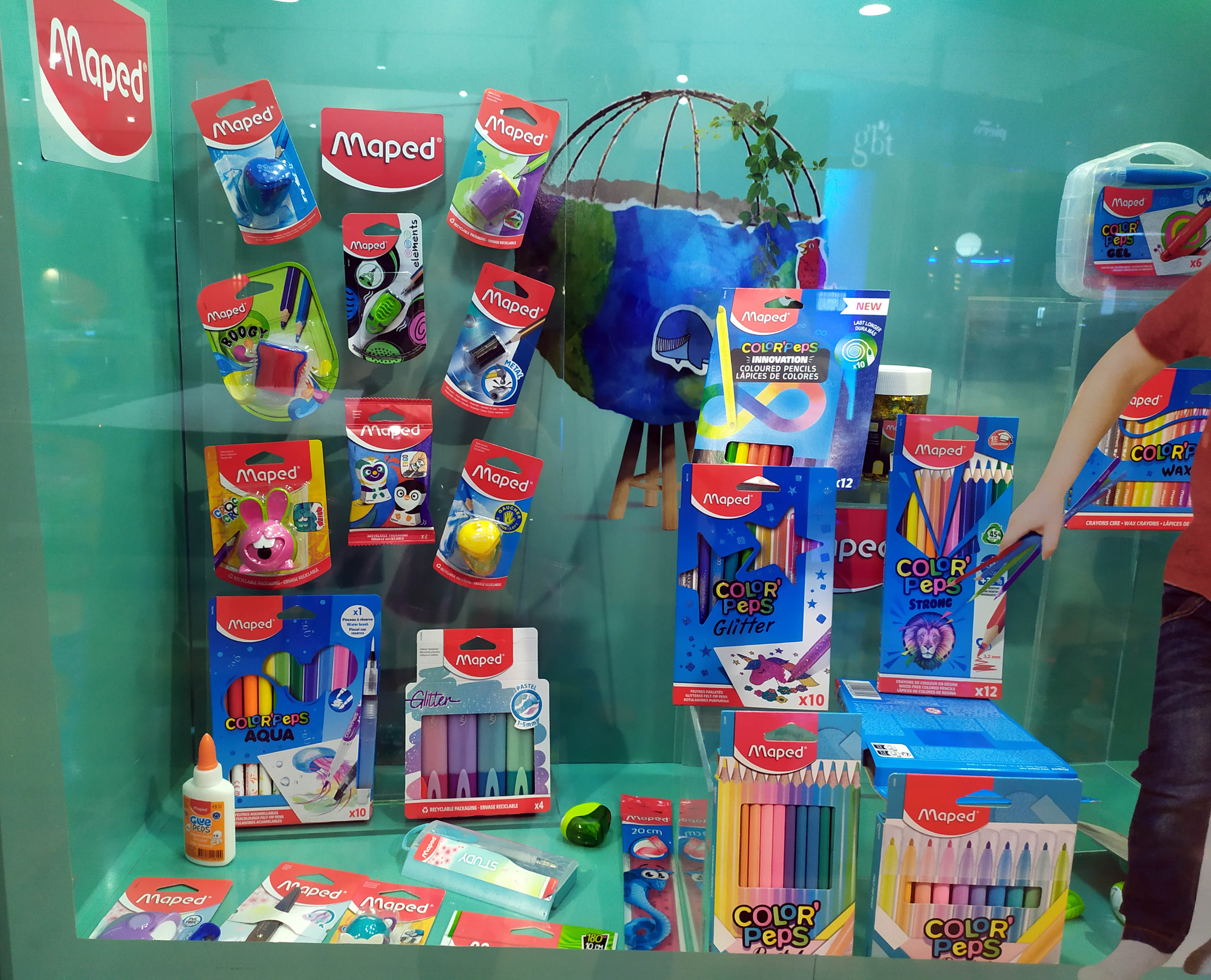
- Maped products at a store in Argentina
- Type: Private
- Industry: Stationery
- Founded: 1947; 79 years ago
- Founder: Claude Lacroix
- Headquarters: Annecy, France
- Area served: Worldwide
- Key people: Jacques Lacroix (CEO)
- Products: School and office goods
- Net income: 3,315,500 € in 2018
- Subsidiaries: Heller SA, Maped Helix, Helix, Helix USA, Helit innovative Büroprodukte GmbH.
- Website: maped.com

Maped (an acronym for "manufacture d'articles de précision et de dessin") is an independent, French, and family-owned brand in school supplies and accessories. Founded in 1947 in Annecy, Haute-Savoie, France, Maped is now present in 125 countries with 20 affiliates in the scissors, pencil and eraser markets. Its capital is €5,155,000 and 50% of the company's turnover is generated outside Europe. Maped creates and manufactures school, writing and office supplies as well as fun and playful activity kits and nomad food containers. Present in various sectors Maped owns 8 different brands: Maped, Maped Office, Maped Picnik, Maped Creativ, Maped Color’Peps, Joustra, Helit and Helix.

== History ==
Maped was founded in 1947 in Annecy, with its first products being traditional brass compasses. Until 1985, the compass remained the only production activity. For almost 40 years, Maped has specialised in the manufacture of geometry sets intended for design offices, Designers, and Architects.

In 1980, Maped joined the GFP (a group of stationery manufacturers) and the GIE (an economic interest grouping), whose aim was to pool together distribution resources. 1985 was the year of Maped's first new range, with the arrival of scissors. That same year, Jacques Lacroix took over the family company. In 1992 the company continued to diversify its activity by acquiring Mallat, French leader in erasers (including the iconic pink and blue Duo Eraser) and started manufacturing erasing and marking products. In 1993, Maped launched a production site and opened a subsidiary, Maped Stationery LTD, in China. That same year, the company started selling office supplies, Hole punchers and staplers. In 1996, the company launched the marketing of pencil sharpeners, followed by school accessories in 1997. At the same moment, Maped became commercially independent in France after the CFP dissolved (a group of stationery manufacturers). The next year, in 1999, a subsidiary in Argentina was created and that same year the company entered the creative leisure sector. In 2002, a factory was acquired in Mexico. The following year, the brand's first television Advertising in France was broadcast and Maped continued to expand with the opening of its subsidiary in Brazil. Also in 2003, Maped started manufacturing Pencil sharpeners. In 2004, Maped adopted a new corporate identity and launched a specialist storage range.

In 2005, affiliates in Canada and in the US were created. The company started to manufacture coloured pencils. In 2006, Maped acquired the German group Helit (office supplies) and its Diplomat writing range, as well as the French company JFP Graphos (storage products) which was merged in 2007.

The company also created a subsidiary in Greece and launched a range of felt-tip pens. In 2007, Maped started selling shears and cutting machines. The following year, a subsidiary in Turkey was created and a school writing range was launched with the famous Twin Tip 4 ball point pen, the 4-colour twin tip ball point pen.

Maped started building a new factory in China, which became operational in 2010. That same year, affiliates in Romania, the Netherlands, and Britain were created. In 2011 the Indian and Peruvian offices opened.

In 2012 Maped acquired and integrated the English family-run business of Helix, the UK's leading school accessory manufacturer, which is now called Maped Helix and created another subsidiary in Russia.

On 21 March 2016, Maped acquired French plastic toy manufacturer Heller Joustra (Heller SA) for 1.5 million euros. Maped announced that it was taking over the Joustra factory, which employed 30 people, and invested 2 million euros with the aim of doubling Heller Joustra's sales in 4 years.

In 2017 Jacques-Antoine Lacroix took over from his father as CEO of Maped.

At the beginning of 2021, Maped has completely rework its brand image, with a new visual identity.

== Products ==
Maped manufactures school supplies (compasses, scissors, erasers, pencil sharpeners, colouring, marking, writing) and office supplies (staplers, hole punches, storage items, etc.) as well as food containers.

The current range of Maped's school and office products include:

| Category | Products |
|---|---|
| School | Ballpoint pens, pencils, erasers, pencil sharpeners, coloured pencils, scissors, marker pens, rulers, set squares, compasses, glue, brushes, pencil cases, colouring books |
| Office | Scissors, utility knives, paper cutters, staplers, hole punchers, clips |
| Craftwork | Architect's scales, angle templates |
