= Pac-Kit First Aid Kits =

US first aid company

Pac-Kit
- Industry: First Aid Kits
- Headquarters: Greenwich, United States
- Owner: Acme United Corporation
- Website: Pac-Kit Home

Pac-Kit Safety Equipment Company has roots dating back to 1880 when Silas Burroughs, a former representative of the US pharmaceutical company John Wyeth & Co, and his business associate Henry Wellcome formed Burroughs Wellcome & Co in the UK. The two started manufacturing compressed pharmaceuticals, a novelty in those days and much safer than medicines prepared by pestle and mortar.

The business thrived, and thanks to the cooperation with many explorers from the late 19th and early 20th century, Burroughs Wellcome gained fame around the world.

In 1946, the Pac-Kit entity was spun off, and became a standalone company. This company was acquired by Acme United Corporation in 2011.

== History ==
=== 1872 - 1880 ===
Henry Bower, an employee with John Wyeth & Co., which later became the giant pharmaceutical company Wyeth, developed one of the first rotary compressed tablet machines in the United States in 1872. This machine enabled the production of medicines in high quantities with unprecedented precision. The compressed pills offered a standardized dose, making them much safer than medicines prepared by pestle and mortar. As Wyeth's pills became popular, more American manufacturers followed their lead and brought uniform pills to the market.

To capture a large part of the market, Wyeth quickly expanded its distribution network in the US and abroad. In 1878, John Wyeth & Co. sent Silas Burroughs to the United Kingdom to import and market Wyeth's products.

Since the less precise pestle and mortar method to prepare medicines was still widely used in the UK, the compressed drugs were an immediate success. Burroughs asked Henry Wellcome to join him to help grow the business. In 1880 Burroughs Wellcome & Company was founded in London soon after the two gentlemen received the exclusive right from Wyeth to sell its products in Europe, Asia, Africa, the East Indies and Australia.

=== 1880 - 1889 ===
Although the drugs were a success, the high stamp duty on imports from the United States to England made the pills costly. As a result, the two partners decided to manufacture the pharmaceuticals themselves. They purchased the necessary machinery for making compressed medicine tablets from Wyeth and opened their first factory in 1883 at Bell Lane Wharf in Wandsworth, England.

The business thrived and soon other manufacturers began to make compressed drugs in England. In order to stay one step ahead of the competition, Burroughs Wellcome, in 1884, trademarked the word “Tabloid”, a blend of the words “tablet” and “alkaloid”, to denote the firm's pills. During the next several years, Burroughs Wellcome & Co. fought and won a number of legal battles to prevent other firms from using the Tabloid name.

Over the years, the Tabloid brand name became a synonym for quality and precision. Burroughs Wellcome decided to apply the name on other items like Tabloid first aid kits and medicine chests, Tabloid photographic developers and even Tabloid tea.

In 1888, the company put together a group of engineers to design and manufacture more reliable and faster machines to make drugs. The result was machinery that produced up to 600 compressed pills per minute with an unprecedented standard of precision. A year later, the company needed a bigger factory and moved to the old Phoenix Paper Mills site at Dartford, England. During the next 25 years, until the outbreak of World War I, Burroughs Wellcome experienced massive worldwide expansion.

=== The Explorers ===
During the majority of the 19th century, the Earth still had many unknown regions including the Himalayan mountains, the North and South Poles and the African continent. In the 1850s, news agencies and research institutes began funding explorers. Burroughs Wellcome started researching the medical requirements of explorers and travelers, tropical diseases and their treatment, and the best methods of presenting and carrying the medicines.

As a result, Burroughs Wellcome developed substantial knowledge and experience which was placed at the disposal of other travelers. It supplied compact medicine cases fitted with important medicaments, bandages, and dressings which were impervious to climatic influences. The company also gave travelers and explorers advice as to the character and quantities of the medicines they would need in accordance with the part of the world in which they proposed to travel and the diseases they could possibly get.

One of the first to avail himself of the results of this specialized research was the well known explorer Sir Henry Morton Stanley, who mapped large parts of the Congo River and Nile and the Lakes Victoria and Tanganyika in central Africa.

As Stanley himself once said, ”I made the acquaintance of Messrs. Burroughs Wellcome & Co. As soon as I came in sight of their preparations and their work, I found the consummation of my secret wish. On my later expeditions I had all the medicines beautifully prepared, and in most elegant fashion arranged in the smallest medicine chest it was ever my lot to carry into Africa.”

Since that time Burroughs Wellcome & Co. supplied medical equipment and first aid kits to nearly every major expedition.

In 1909, former U.S. president Theodore Roosevelt took a break from statesmanship and followed one of his first loves: travelling. He hunted for big game in Africa, but also brought back scientific information as well as zoological and botanical specimens. Five years later, he organized an expedition to Brazil. On that occasion he explored a river which was later named after him, the Rio Teodoro. On both occasions, Roosevelt carried the Tabloid products from Burroughs Wellcome with him.

Also in 1909, Admiral Robert E. Peary was the first to reach the North Pole. When he returned, Admiral Peary presented to Burroughs Wellcome specimens of Tabloid products that he had carried with him to the North Pole.

Several years later, the Norwegian Captain Roald Amundsen and the Englishman Captain Robert Scott raced to become the first to reach the South Pole. Both expeditions started almost simultaneously but it was Amundsen who reached the pole first on December 14, 1911. Both men carried Tabloid outfits with them.

On foot, by ship and also in the air, Burroughs Wellcome's first aid kits were indispensable. In 1926, the American Richard E. Byrd was the first to fly over the North Pole and in 1929 he repeated his act of bravery when he flew as first over the South Pole. On both occasions Rear Admiral Byrd carried Tabloid medical equipment.

The experiences of these adventurers showed that ‘Tabloid’ first aid kits and equipment met their need, not only because they took up little room, but for the reason that they were resistant to the effects of climate and weather conditions.

=== Pac-Kit ===
In 1922, Burroughs Wellcome was invited by the insurance carrier of American Telephone and Telegraph Company to devise a solution for the high number of minor injuries that became infected. In response, they designed a system that standardized all the antiseptics, medications and dressings into small unit-dose treatment packages sized specifically for first aid kits. Burroughs Wellcome trademarked this new packaging design Pac-Kit.

After World War II, Burroughs Wellcome divested some divisions to focus on its core business of manufacturing drugs. The first aid operation was one of these divisions and was sold to two employees: William Fallon and Cecil R. Brown. The company operated as an unincorporated partnership until 1958 when Mr. Fallon was killed in an auto accident. The Brown family purchased Mr. Fallon's half of the company and incorporated the business as Pac-Kit Safety Equipment Company, Inc in 1960.

=== OSHA and Pac-Kit’s further Expansion ===
In 1970, the safety equipment industry in the US dramatically changed with the enactment of the Occupational Safety and Health Act (OSHA) in the U.S. This law required that first-aid kits be present in every business with employees. Pac-Kit's growth was substantial due to the new OSHA requirements, and the company purchased a larger, 32,000 sq. ft. facility in Norwalk, Connecticut in 1973. Four years later, the company expanded again when it purchased a 40,000 sq. ft. facility in Norwalk, Connecticut for use as an off-site warehouse.

Pac-Kit also invested in high speed packaging equipment during the 1970s and 1980s which made it possible to enter the hospital disposable market with general surgical prep products.

Since the hospital and first aid markets had totally different operational requirements and management needs, Pac-Kit split into two companies in 1995: The Pac-Kit Safety Equipment Co. operated by Roy M. Brown and The K.W. Griffen Corporation operated by James B. Brown. In subsequent years, Pac-Kit continued to expand its number of first aid kits for the American workplace.

=== Pac-Kit as Acme United Brand ===
In February 2011, Acme United purchased the accounts receivable, inventory, equipment, brands, historical records and photographs of Pac-Kit Safety Equipment for $3.4 million.

When Acme United acquired Pac-Kit, it already owned a first aid business called PhysicianCare, which sold first aid and over-the-counter (OTC) medical products to industrial markets. Acme United therefore already had experienced personnel in that product category, as well as familiarity with the first aid market.

As a result, Pac-Kit increased its revenues from $4.5 million to $5.2 million in the first 10 months after it was acquired. In that same period, Pac-Kit's margins increased from around 27% to over 30% thanks to increased buying power.

And Pac-Kit has continued to expand since. In 2013 it started manufacturing twelve different first aid kits for a large industrial tool distributor. These kits are all targeted at different industries such as welding, construction, mining, etc. Pac-Kit's business is also growing with traditional office supply customers as they look to offer products outside their core office supplies.

In 2015, Acme United consolidated its US first aid production facilities. As such, the Pac-Kit production was moved from Norwalk, CT to the First Aid Only plant in Vancouver, Washington.

Today, Pac-kit sells a wide variety of first aid kits, industrial stations and refills, and emergency medical travel and recreational kits for the industrial, safety, transportation and marine markets. It is known for tailoring these items to meet user requirements and for rapid turnaround.
