= Rolling ruler =

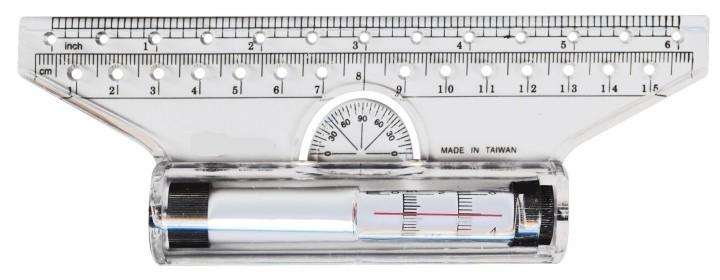
A rolling parallel ruler

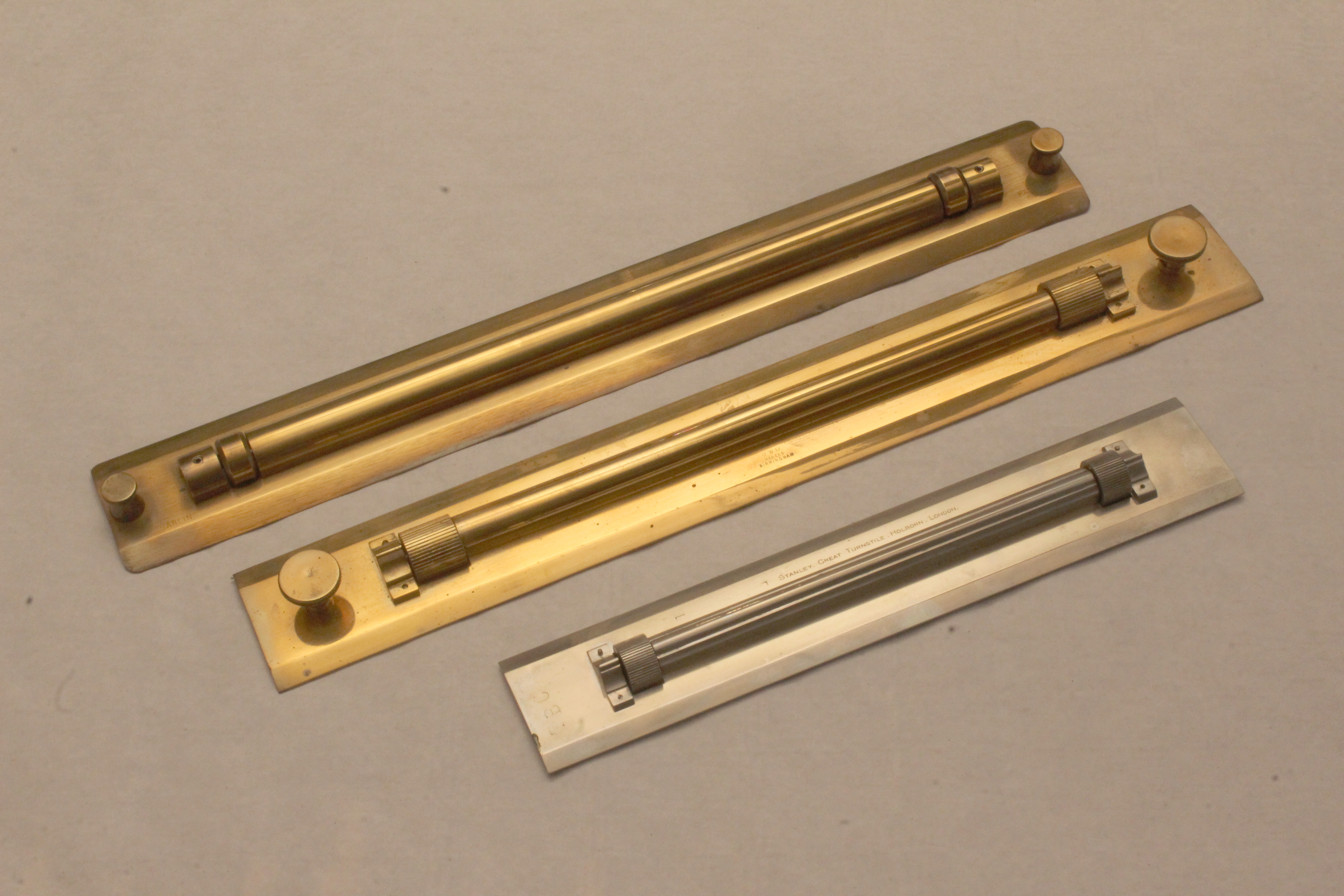
Antique rolling rulers

A rolling ruler (also known as a parallel glider) is a ruler that contains a cylinder much like a rolling pin inside, thereby enabling it to "roll" along a sheet of paper or other surface where it is being used. A rolling ruler can draw straight, parallel lines, and also has other instruments included, enabling it to do the jobs of a protractor and compass.

The modern rolling ruler, with protractor, pivot pin and multiple pin holes serving as fixed length compasses has been patented in the US in 1991 by Wei Wang.
