= Ludwig Burmester =

German kinematician and geometer (1840–1927)

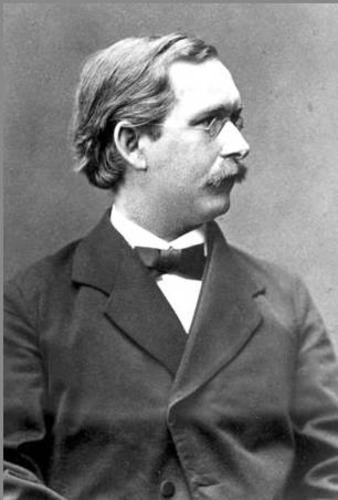
Ludwig Burmester

Ludwig Ernst Hans Burmester (5 May 1840 – 20 April 1927) was a German kinematician and geometer.

His doctoral thesis Über die Elemente einer Theorie der Isophoten (from German: About the elements of a theory of isophotes) concerned lines on a surface defined by light direction. After a period as a teacher in Łódź he became professor of synthetic geometry at Dresden where his growing interest in kinematics culminated in his Lehrbuch der Kinematik, Erster Band, Die ebene Bewegung (Textbook of Kinematics, First Volume, Planar Motion) of 1888, developing the approach to the theory of linkages introduced by Franz Reuleaux, whereby a planar mechanism was understood as a collection of Euclidean planes in relative motion with one degree of freedom. Burmester considered both the theory of planar kinematics and practically all actual mechanisms known in his time. In doing so, Burmester developed Burmester theory which applies projective geometry to the loci of points on planes moving in straight lines and in circles, where any motion may be understood in relation to four Burmester points.

The Burmester linkage of 1888 is a four bar linkage part of whose coupler curve is an approximately straight line (see also Watt's linkage). Burmester is also known for his focal linkage, which is a highly over-constrained but movable linkage related to Kempe's focal linkage and Hart's straight line linkages.

Burmester is the inventor of the French curve; thus, a French curve may also be called a Burmester curve.
