= Walter Johnsen =

Walter C. Johnsen
- Johnsen in September 2012
- Born: Walter Craig Johnsen; December 15, 1950 (age 75); New York City, U.S.
- Education: Cornell University (BS, MS); Columbia University (MBA)
- Occupations: Chairman and CEO of Acme United Corporation
- Board member of: Acme United Corporation; TOMI Environmental Solutions, Inc.
- Spouse: Wendy Davies (m. 1990)
- Children: 1

Walter Craig Johnsen (born December 15, 1950) is the chairman and chief executive officer of Acme United Corporation, which is a supplier of cutting, measuring and safety products for the school, home, office, hardware and industrial markets.

Johnsen joined Acme United in January 1995 as a board member and became CEO later that year. Under his leadership, Acme United became the leading scissors brand in the United States and one of the leading ruler brands in North America. In addition, Acme United has become one of the top-3 producers of first aid kits in the United States.

== Early life and education ==
Johnsen was born in New York City, the son of Walter S. Johnsen, a co-founder of Armel Electronics and Therese Johnsen, a high-end residential real estate sales agent. His father was Norwegian, while his mother's family was from Denmark.

After graduating from Ramsey High School, in Bergen County, New Jersey, Johnsen attended Cornell University, from which he graduated with a Bachelor of Science in chemical engineering and a Master of Science in chemical engineering. During those years he was an intern in the US House of Representatives, Banking and Currency Committee, where he worked on a loan guarantee for Lockheed.

In 2006, Johnsen established the Rosenblatt Faculty Fellow Endowment to honor the memory of Frank Rosenblatt, a former professor and mentor at Cornell. Dr. Rosenblatt drowned in the Chesapeake Bay during a boating trip, while being accompanied by Walter Johnsen and another student.

Johnsen first joined Pfizer Inc., where he was a process engineer and later production supervisor making penicillin and other sterile pharmaceuticals.

In 1978, he graduated from Columbia Business School, where he received a Master of Business Administration.

== Career ==
After Johnsen received his MBA, he joined Smith Barney, where he held various venture capital positions. He became Managing Partner of the firm's West Coast private equity activities. Amongst others, he was a general partner of First Century Partnership II and First Century Partnership III, which was one of the early investors in Apple Inc.

In 1986 he and an associate acquired Marshall Products, Inc., a distributor of medical, home health-care and juvenile products based in Lincolnshire, IL. Marshall grew from $18 million to $40 million in annual revenues in four years, and became the largest supplier of blood-pressure units and stethoscopes in the US. In 1990, Marshall Products was sold for $25 million to Omron Corp, a Japanese electronics manufacturer.

After the leveraged buyout of Marshall Partners, Johnsen became a special limited partner at Harvest Partners. He also founded Johnsen Properties, which invested in real estate in southeast Connecticut.

In January 1995, when his non-compete ended with Omron, Johnsen joined Acme United Corp. as a board member.

After a disastrous 1995, in which Acme United reported a loss of $8.7 million, Dwight Wheeler II was replaced by Walter Johnsen as CEO. Johnsen immediately initiated a fierce cost reduction program. He shut down five plants, moved most of the production to a modern, lower cost, facility in North Carolina, reduced the company's inventory and laid off about 800 people, including nine senior managers.

The company lost another $3.2 million in 1996, mostly due to restructuring charges. In 1997, production shifted to China. The savings generated from that switch were invested in innovation and laid the foundation for Acme United's further growth.

From 2005 until 2014, Johnsen was a member of the listed company council of the New York Stock Exchange to advise on issues and concerns affecting small and mid-cap companies.

In January 2016, Johnsen joined the Board of Directors of TOMI Environmental Solutions, Inc.

== Personal life ==
Johnsen is one of the founding members of the Stonington Harbor Yacht Club and was commodore of the club between 2007 and 2009. He also enjoys history and global economics.

He is married to Wendy Davies and together they have one son.
