= Clauss Cutlery Company =

Cutlery brand

Clauss
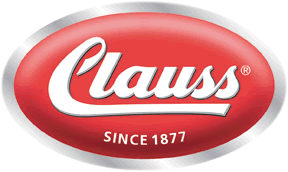
- Industry: Cutting Tools
- Founded: 1877; 149 years ago
- Owner: Acme United Corporation
- Website: Clauss Home

Clauss Cutlery is a cutlery brand owned by the Acme United Corporation since 2004. It was founded as Elyria Shear Works in 1877 by John and Henrie Clauss in Elyria, Ohio. At one time the company was the largest manufacturer of scissors and shears in the world.

== History ==
=== 1877–1918 ===
The two brothers John and Henrie Clauss, of German origin, started Elyria Shear Works from a one-room building in Elyria, Ohio. Together with five employees, they began manufacturing scissors, shears, straight razors and serrated kitchen knives.

In the early 1880s, with his shear business prospering, John Clauss planned a major expansion. In August 1887, he moved the company to Fremont, Ohio, to be near an accessible, abundant supply of natural gas which had recently been discovered. The gas was ideally suited to fuel the furnaces for the company's forges and foundry. Clauss erected a two-stories-high plant at the corner of North Buchanan Street and Pine Street. Within one year, the company was producing 3,000 pairs of shears and scissors a day.

On January 17, 1889, disaster struck as the plant was completely destroyed by fire, causing 125 employees to lose their jobs. However, in less than four months, Clauss built a new plant and was back in full operation. The new four-story brick building at the corner of State Street and Sandusky Avenue was the largest shear factory in the world at that moment. Clauss also used this opportunity to change the company's name to Clauss Shear Company.

=== 1919–1945 ===
In 1919, Clauss Shear merged with Henkel Company, also from Fremont, to create Henkel–Clauss Company. Henkel Company was founded in 1906 to manufacture nail files, knives, shears and razors. The Henkel–Clauss merger created a company with over 1,000 employees and had the largest payroll in the United States at that time. John Clauss didn't live long to enjoy that success as he died later that year.

In the early 1920s the cutlery business faced a serious setback as Germany was permitted to export shears and scissors duty-free to the United States. The idea behind this was to help Germany pay back its World War I debts. As a consequence, German shears sold at half the price of American made shears. Despite the fierce German competition, Fremont counted twenty-five cutlery businesses and was known as the "Cutlery Center of the World".

=== 1946–1966 ===
After World War II, Henkel–Clauss was unable to compete with European firms producing household scissors and other simple products because wages were much lower in Europe. As a result, the company shifted focus to industrial scissors. Henkel–Clauss continued to struggle as much of its sales revenue came from declining industries or businesses where automation was reducing the need for scissors.

In 1954 the corporate name was changed to Clauss Cutlery Company to eliminate the confusion with the German cutlery firm J.A. Henckels.

=== 1967–2004 ===
In 1967 Clauss was taken over by Alco Standard Corporation. Alco Standard, which later divested its manufacturing companies to create Alco Industries, integrated Clauss into its existing structure to manufacture tools for industrial niche markets. For instance, Clauss made surgical scissors for eye operations, heavy-duty metal cutting shears, poultry shears for gutting chickens, and specialty items such as anti-acid, anti-magnetic tweezers for the electronics industry.

Clauss had approximately 100 employees and produced about $18 million in annual revenues in the late 1980s, but profits continued to decline. In May 2004, Acme United Corporation acquired the Clauss inventory, trademarks and brand names from Alco Industries for approximately $500,000.

=== 2005–present ===
The Clauss business was immediately integrated into Acme United's existing operations. Since then, the number of Clauss products has continued to expand. In 2006 and 2007 the company brought sewing shears, utility knives, chef shears, hobby knives and a titanium-bonded, spring-assisted pruner to market.

In 2008, Clauss introduced the SpeedPak utility knife and its replaceable cartridges with ten titanium blades, having won a Good Design Award from the Chicago Athenaeum, Museum of Architecture and Design in 2007.

Early 2013, Clauss launched a family of titanium-bonded, non-stick putty knives that make use of a coating to protect the tools from rust and allow easier application of putty.

More recently, Clauss introduced an 8-inch (200 mm) workbench shear with titanium-bonded blades, with an integrated box cutter and bottle opener.

As of 2024 Clauss website does not mention where their products are actually made these days.
