= French curve =

Template made from metal, wood or plastic composed of segments of smooth curves

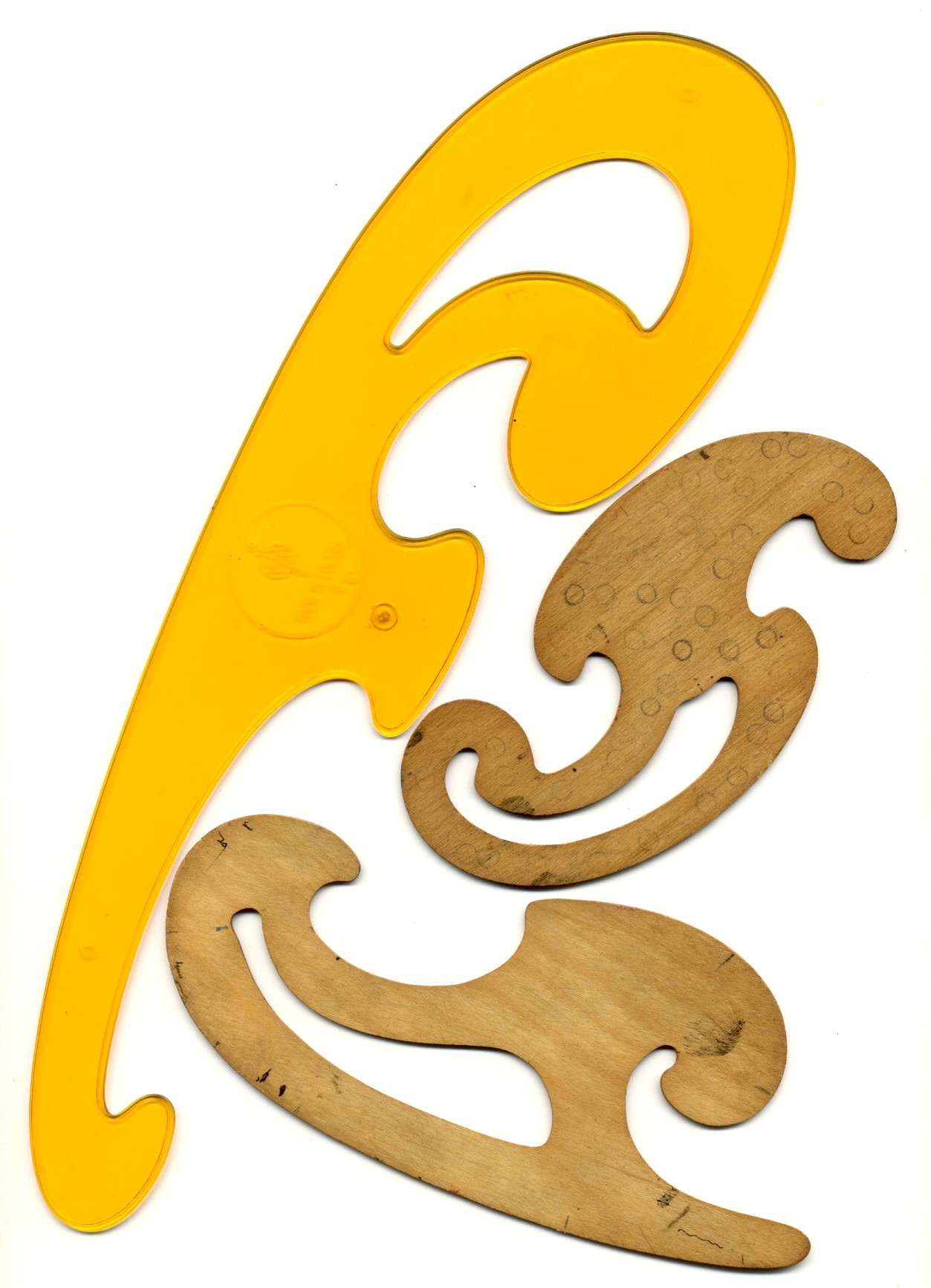
A set of the three most common French curves, also known as a Burmester set. The bottom object is most commonly used for hyperbolas; the smaller one above it is suited for ellipses. The large one is used mostly for parabolas.

A French curve is a template usually made from metal, wood or plastic composed of many different curved segments. It is used in manual drafting and in fashion design to draw smooth curves of varying radii. The curve is placed on the drawing material, and a pencil, knife or other implement is traced around its curves to produce the desired result. They were invented by the German mathematician Ludwig Burmester and are also known as Burmester (curve) set.

== Clothing design ==
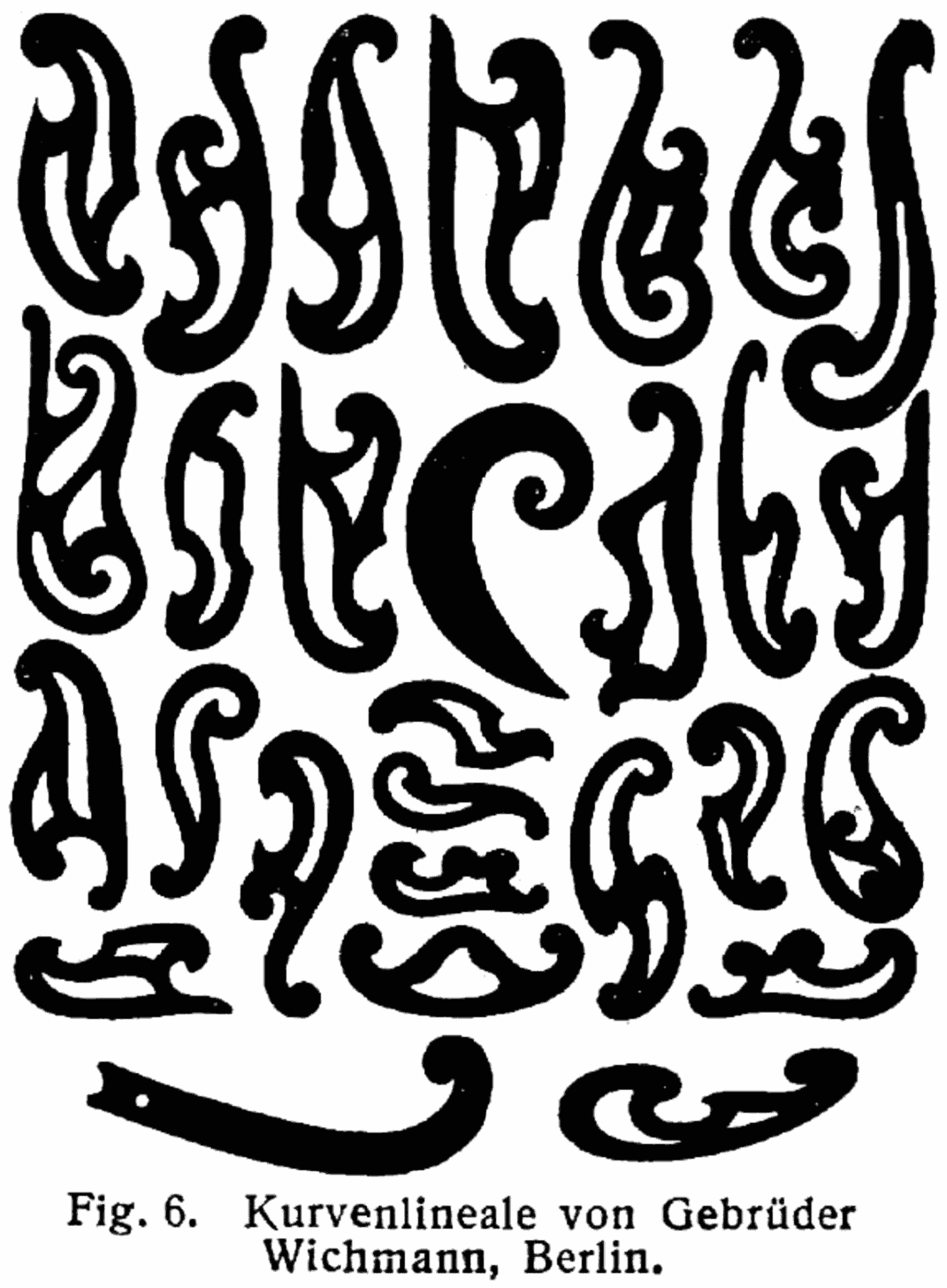
A complete Burmester set from the Lexikon der gesamten Technik (1904)

French curves are used in fashion design and sewing alongside hip curves, straight edges and right-angle rulers. Commercial clothing patterns can be personalized for fit by using French curves to draw neckline, sleeve, bust and waist variations.

== See also ==
- Flat spline – Long flexible batten used to produce a fair curve through a set of points
- Lesbian rule – Flexible strip of lead for use in molding
- Ruler – Instrument used to measure distances
- Technical drawing tool – Tools and instruments used for accurate and precise manual drafting
