= Flat spline =

Long flexible batten used to produce a fair curve through a set of points

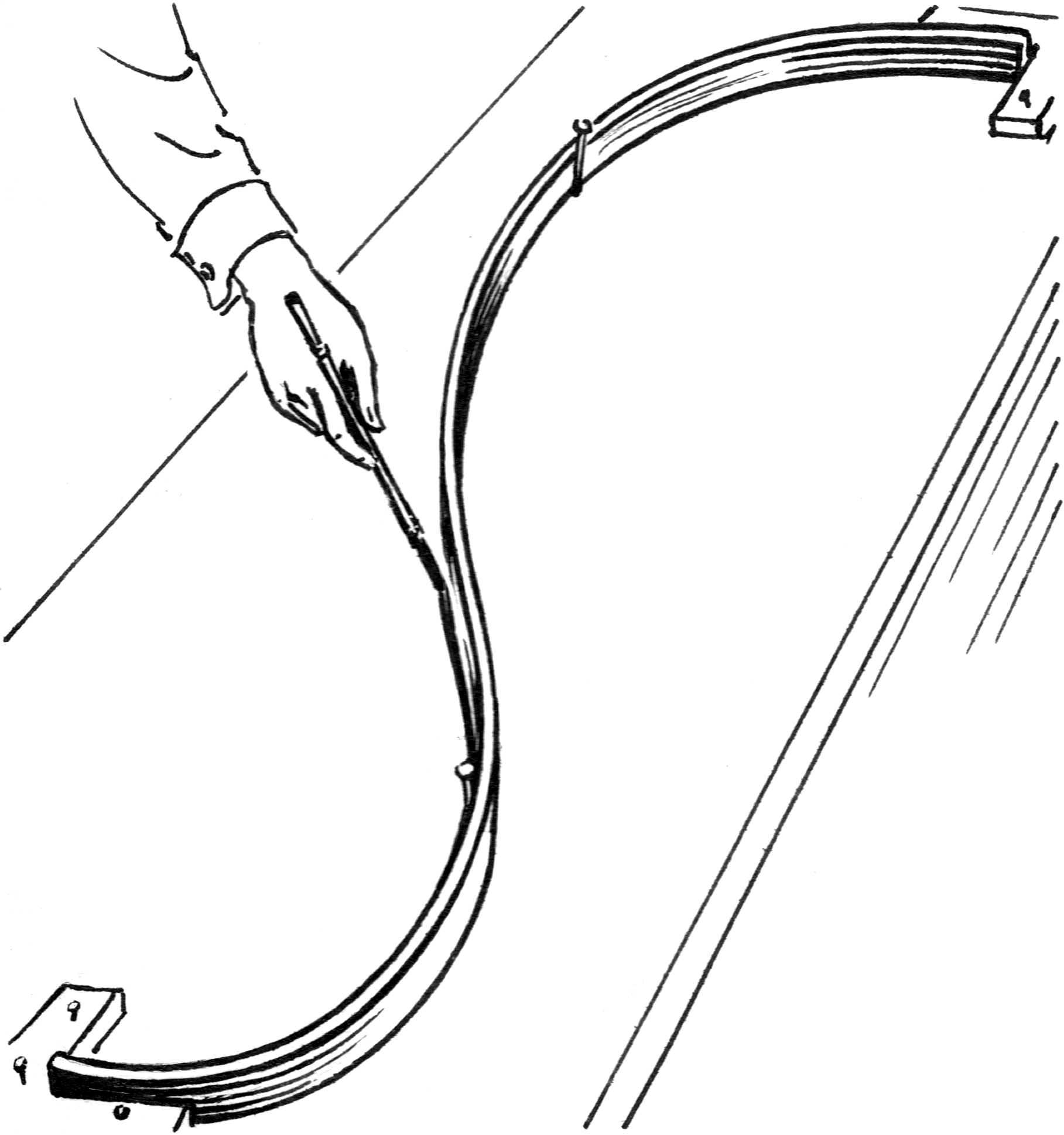
A spline

A spline consists of a long strip fixed in position at a number of points whose tension creates a smooth curve passing through those points, for the purpose of transferring that curve to another material.

Before computers were used for creating engineering designs, drafting tools were employed by designers drawing by hand. To draw curves, especially for shipbuilding, draftsmen often used long, thin, flexible strips of wood, plastic, or metal called splines (or laths, not to be confused with lathes). The splines were held in place with lead weights (called ducks because of their duck-like shape). The elasticity of the spline material combined with the constraint of the control points, or knots, would cause the strip to take the shape that minimized the energy required for bending it between the fixed points, this being the smoothest possible shape.

One can recreate an original draftsman's spline device with weights and a length of thin plastic or wood, flexible to bend enough without breaking. Crosses are marked on the paper to designate the knots or control points. The spline is placed on the drafting paper, and weights are attached to the shaft near each knot so that the spline passes through each one. Once adjusted to the satisfaction of the drafter, a line may be traced along the shaft, creating a template for a smooth curve.

== Etymology and history ==
The Oxford English Dictionary finds the first recorded usage in the 18th century in East Anglia, England, and suggests the term spline may be related to splinter.

Spline devices have been used to designs shapes for pianos, violins, and other wooden instruments. The Wright brothers used one to shape the wings of their aircraft.

== Mathematical splines ==
By 1946, mathematicians had begun to devise mathematical formulae to serve a similar purpose, and ultimately created efficient algorithms to find piecewise polynomial curves, also known as splines, that go smoothly through designated points. This has led to the widespread use of such functions in computer-aided design, especially in the surface designs of vehicles, replacing the draftsman's spline. I. J. Schoenberg gave the spline function its name after its resemblance to the mechanical spline used by draftsmen.

== Other curve drawing tools ==
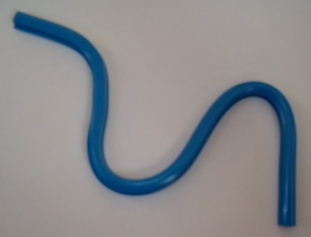
A modern flexible curve

A related but distinct device is the "flexible curve", which can be molded by hand and used to design or copy a complex curve. Unlike a spline, the flexible curve does not have significant tension, so it maintains a given shape, instead of minimizing its curvature between points. The equivalent device was known in antiquity as a Lesbian rule. The ancient form was made of lead (sourced on the island of Lesbos; hence the name); while the modern form consists of a lead core enclosed in vinyl or rubber.

== See also ==
- French curve – Template made from metal, wood or plastic composed of segments of smooth curves
- Lesbian rule – Flexible strip of lead for use in molding
- Technical drawing tool – Tools and instruments used for accurate and precise manual drafting
- Spline (mathematics) – piecewise polynomial curves that smoothly interpolate points
