= Western Tablet and Stationery Company, Building No. 2 =

- Western Tablet and Stationery Company, Building #2
- U.S. National Register of Historic Places
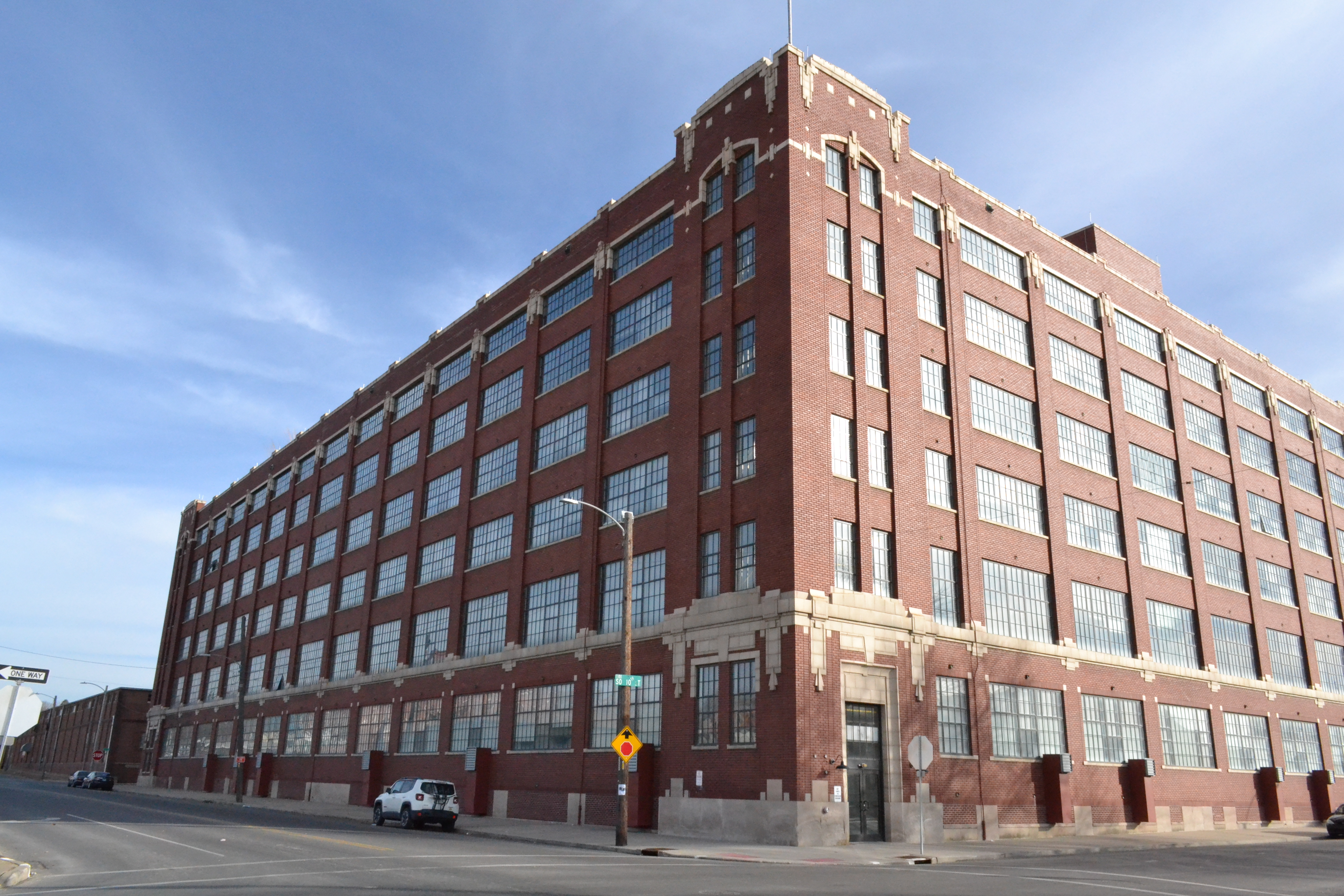

- Location within Missouri Location within the United States
- Location: 1300 S 12th St., St. Joseph, Missouri
- Coordinates: 39°45′24″N 94°50′45″W
- Area: 1.6 acres (0.65 ha)
- Built: 1920, 1941
- Architectural style: Prairie School
- MPS: St. Joseph, Buchanan County, Missouri MPS AD
- NRHP reference No.: 07000814
- Added to NRHP: August 16, 2007

Western Tablet and Stationery Company, Building #2, also known as WESTAB Building #2 and Meade Corp. Building #2, is a historic industrial building located at St. Joseph, Missouri. The original section was built in 1920, with an L-shaped addition built in 1941. It is a six-story, reinforced concrete frame and brick masonry building on a raised basement. It was designed with Prairie School style-derived influence. The St. Joseph facility was closed in 2004.

It was listed on the National Register of Historic Places in 2007.
