= Stationery =

Writing materials

Stationery products in a Japanese store

Stationery refers to sheets, pads, envelopes, rolls, reels, and books for writing on, including cut paper and continuous form paper. Stationery usually specifies materials to be written on by hand (e.g., letter paper) or by equipment such as computer printers.

Office supplies such as writing instruments, utensils and containers are sold by some stationers, and may or may not be considered stationery.

== History of stationery ==
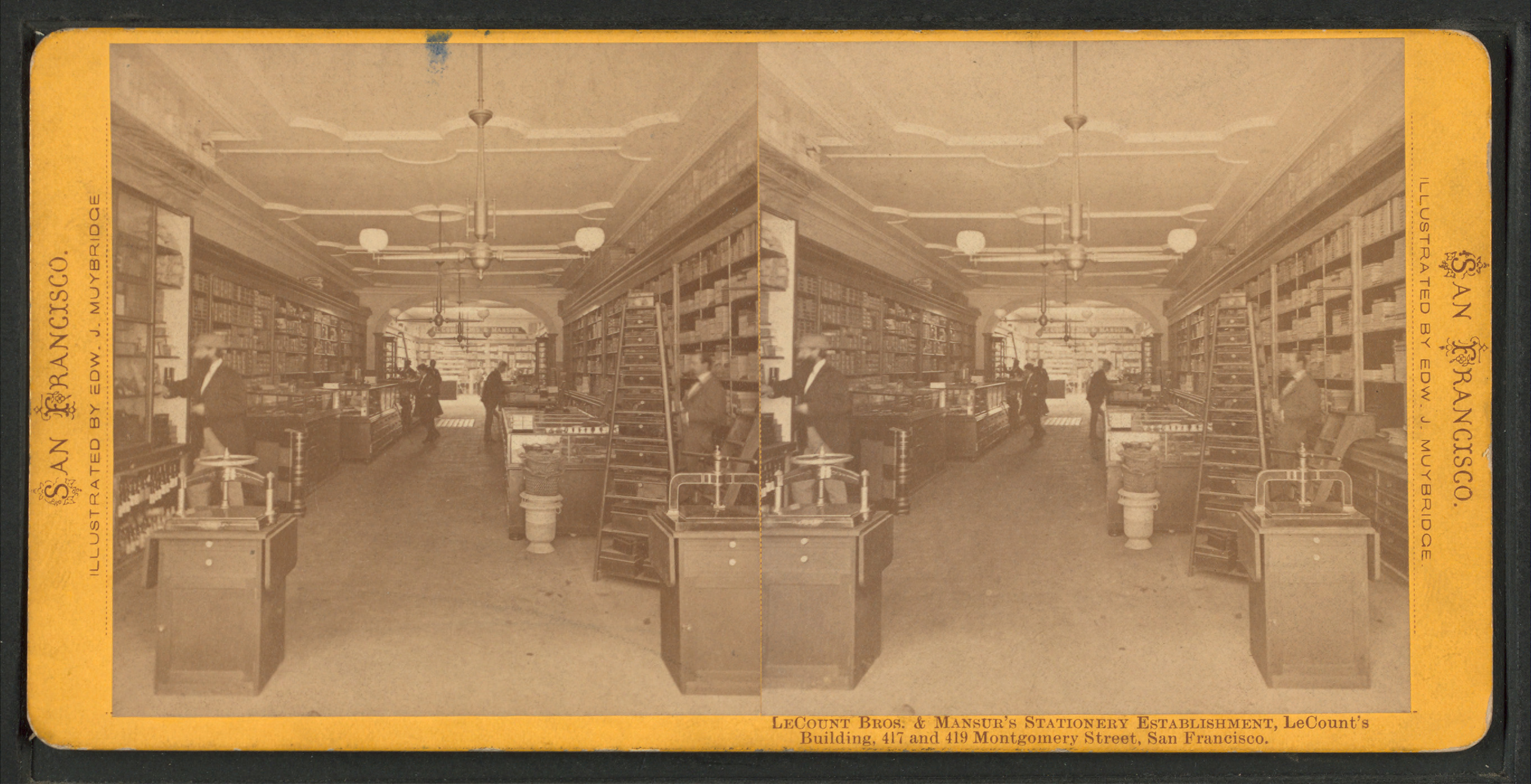
Le Count Bros. & Mansur's Stationery Establishment, San Francisco, circa 1865?-1880? by Eadweard Muybridge

Originally, the term 'stationery' referred to all products sold by a stationer, whose name indicated that his bookshop was at a fixed location. This was usually somewhere near a university, and permanent, while medieval trading was mainly carried on by itinerant peddlers (including chapmen, who sold books) and others (such as farmers and craftsmen) at markets and fairs. It was a unique term used between the 13th and 15th centuries in the manuscript culture. Stationers' shops were places where books were bound, copied, and published. These shops often rented books to students at nearby universities. The books were loaned out in sections, allowing students to study or copy them, and the only way to get the next section was to return the previous one.

In some cases, stationers' shops became the preferred choice for scholars seeking books, rather than university libraries, because they offered a wider selection. The Stationers' Company formerly held a monopoly over the publishing industry in England and was responsible for copyright regulations.

== Uses of stationery ==
=== Printing ===
Printing is the process of applying a colouring agent to a surface to create a body of text or illustrations. This is often achieved through printing technology, but can be done by hand using more traditional methods. The earliest form of printing is woodblock printing.

==== Letterpress ====
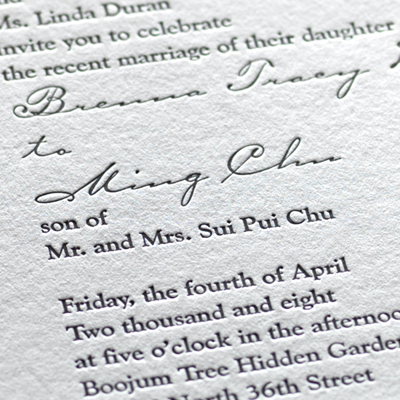
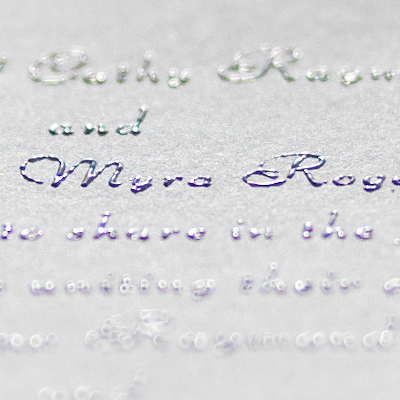
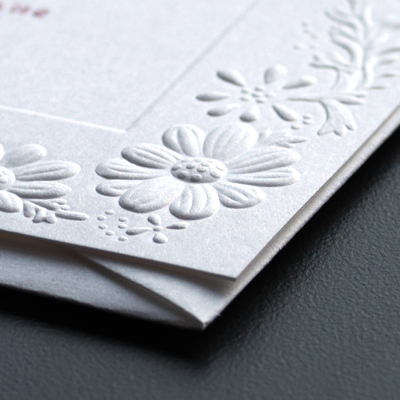
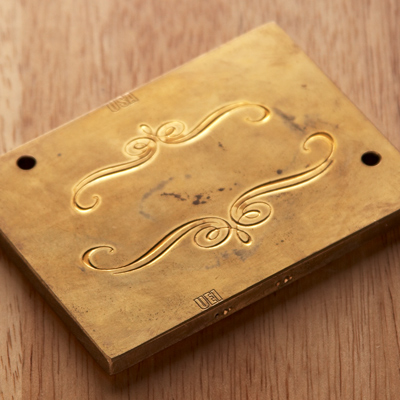
Examples for each category of the various printing techniques for stationery. Clockwise, from upper left: Letterpressed paper, thermographic printed paper, an engraving plate, and embossed paper.

Letterpress is a process of printing several identical copies that presses words and designs onto the page. The print may be inked or blind, but is typically done in a single color. Motifs or designs may be added as many letterpress machines use movable plates that must be hand-set. Letterpress printing remained the primary method of printing until the 19th century.

==== Single documents ====
When a single document needs to be produced, it may be handwritten or printed, typically by a computer printer. Several copies of one original paper can be produced by some printers using multipart stationery. Typing with a typewriter is largely obsolete, having been superseded for most purposes by preparing a document with a word processor and then printing it.

==== Thermographic ====
Thermographic printing is a process that involves several stages but can be implemented in a low-cost manufacturing process. The process involves printing the desired designs or text with an ink that remains wet, rather than drying on contact with the paper. The paper is then dusted with a powdered polymer that adheres to the ink. The paper is vacuumed or mechanically or manually agitated to remove excess powder, then heated to near combustion. The wet ink and polymer bond and dry, resulting in a raised print surface similar to the result of an engraving process.

=== Embossing ===
Embossing is a printing technique used to create raised surfaces in the converted paper stock. The process relies upon mated dies that press the paper into a shape that can be observed on both the front and back surfaces. Two things are required during the process of embossing: a die and a stock. The result is a three-dimensional (3D) effect that emphasizes a particular area of the design.

=== Engraving ===
Engraving is a process that requires a design to be cut into a plate made of relatively hard material. The metal plate is first polished so that the design cut can be easily visible to the person. This technology has a long history and requires a significant amount of skill, experience, and expertise. The finished plate is usually covered in ink, and then the ink is removed from all of the un-etched portions of the plate. The plate is then pressed into paper under substantial pressure. The result is a design that is slightly raised on the surface of the paper and covered in ink. Due to the cost of the process and expertise required, many consumers opt for thermographic printing, a process that results in a similarly raised print surface, but through different means at less cost.

== Classifications ==
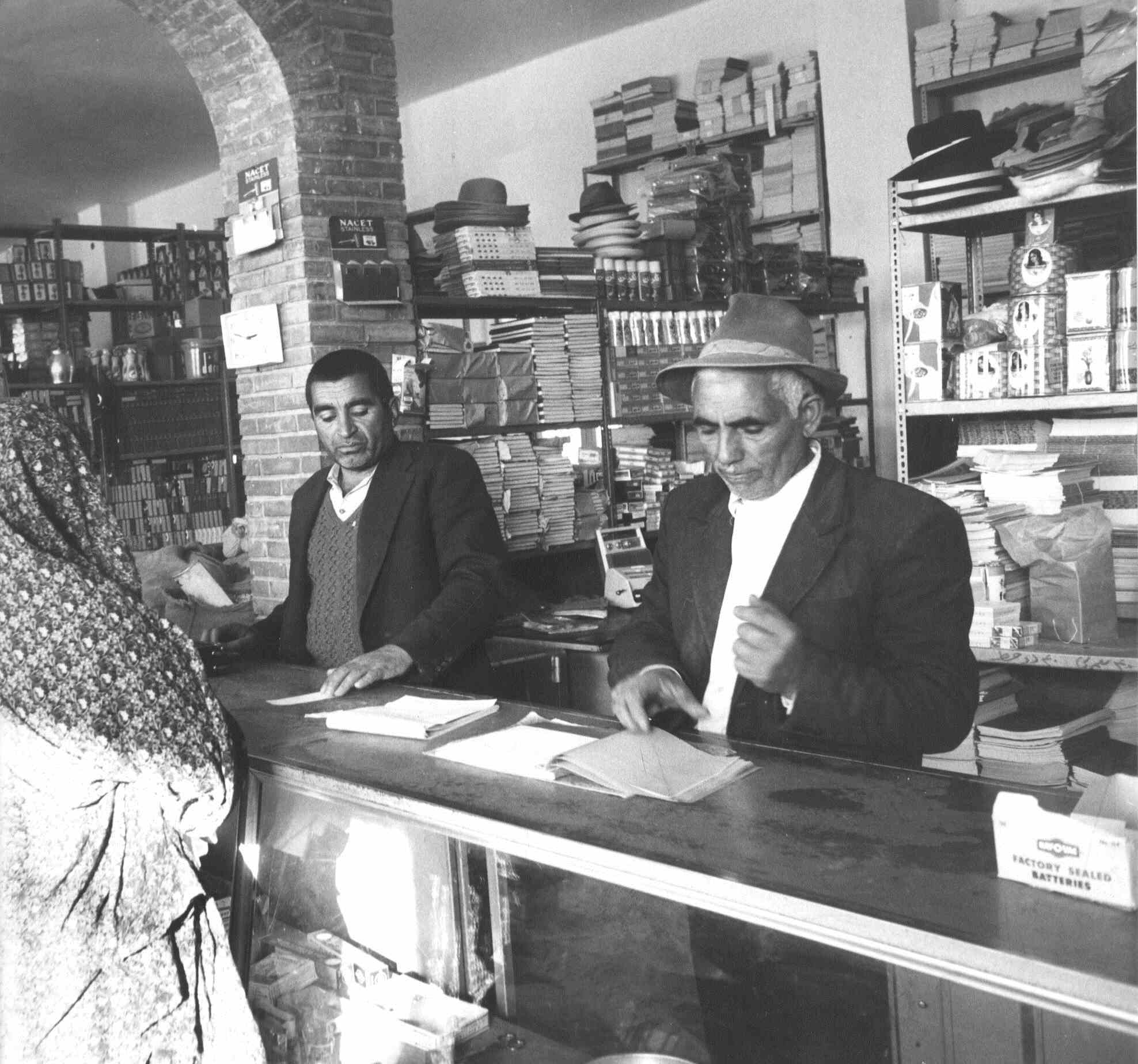
A stationery shop on 4 November 1973 in Iran

- Business stationery: Business card, letterhead, presentation folder, invoice, receipt
- Ink and toner:
  - Dot matrix printer's ink ribbon
  - Inkjet cartridge
  - Laser printer toner
  - Photocopier toner
- Filing and storage:
  - Expandable file
  - File folder, hanging file folder
  - Ring binder
  - Index card
  - Two-pocket portfolio
- Mailing and shipping supplies:
  - Envelope
- Paper and pad:
  - Notebooks, wirebound notebook, writing pads, college ruled paper, wide-ruled paper
  - Office paper: dot matrix paper, inkjet printer paper, laser printer paper, photocopy paper
  - Loose leaves

== School supplies ==
Many shops that sell stationery also sell other school supplies for students in primary and secondary education, including pocket calculators, display boards, compasses and protractors, pencil cases, set squares, lunch boxes, and related items. With the use of various stationary items available, it provides students a chance to enhance their creativity and form of expression.

== Office supplies ==
Office supplies are consumables and equipment regularly used in offices by businesses and other organizations, required to sustain office operations. For example, office supplies may be used by individuals engaged in written communications, record-keeping and bookkeeping. The range of items classified as office supplies varies, and typically includes small, expendable, daily use items, and consumable products.

=== Typical products ===
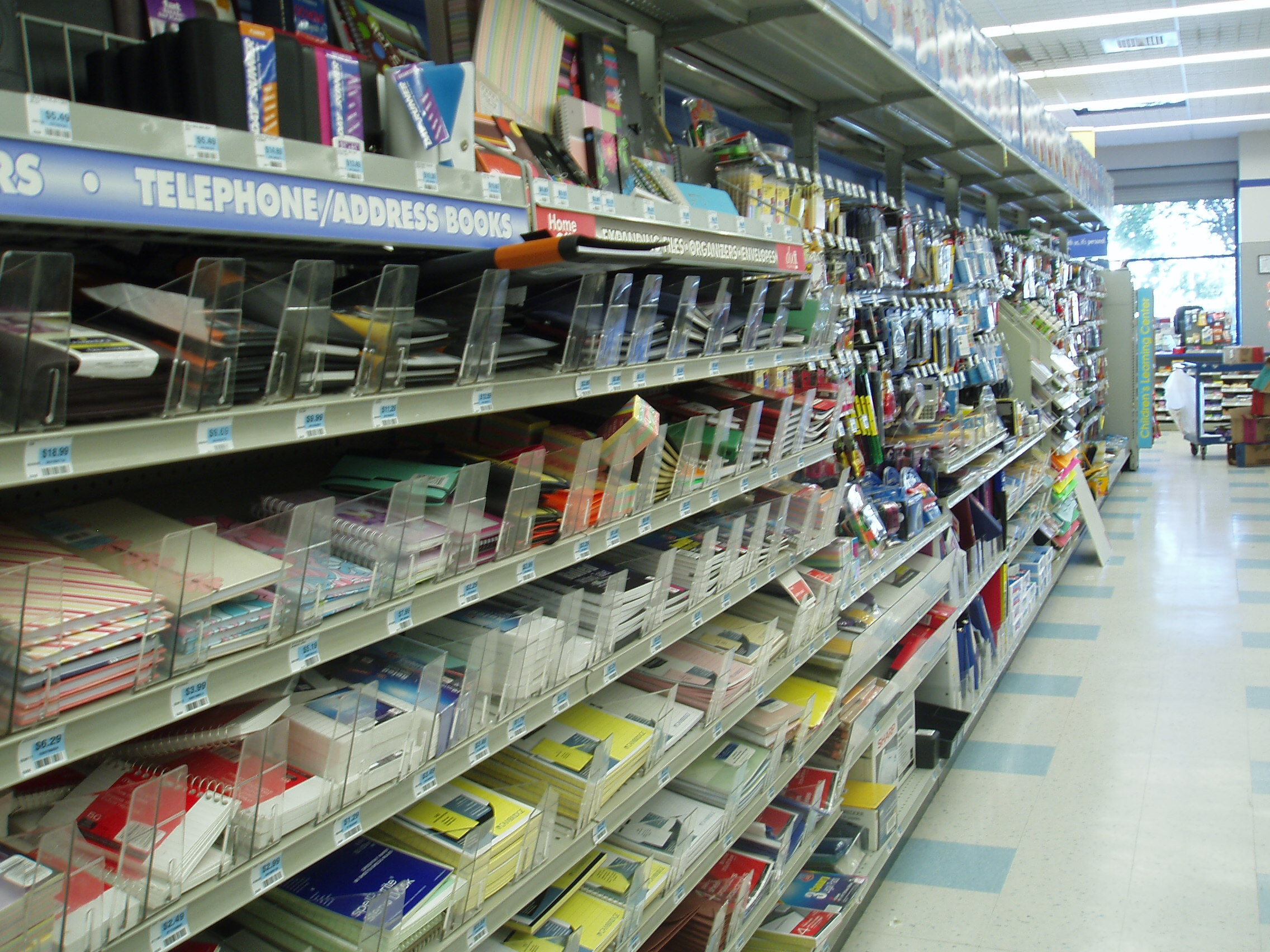
Shelves full of office supplies

Office supplies are typically divided by type of product and general use. Some of the many different office supply products include

- Blank sheet paper: various paper sizes from small notes to letter and poster-size; various thicknesses from tissue paper to 120 pound; construction paper; photocopier and inkjet printer paper;
- Preprinted forms: time cards, tax reporting forms (1099, W-2), "while you were out" pads, desk and wall calendars;
- Label and adhesive paper: name tags, file folder labels, post-it notes, sticker, and address labels;
- Media: ink and toner cartridges; memory cards and flash drives;
- Communication equipment: desk telephones, cell phones, and VOIP adapters; Wi-Fi adapters, ethernet cable, network routers and switches;
- Paper in roll or reel form: label tape, fax machine thermal paper, and adding machine tape;
- Educational and entertainment items: books (business, time management and self-help), tax, business application and game software, desk accessories such as a Newton's cradle;
- Mechanical fasteners: paper clips, binder clips, staples;
- Chemical fasteners: duct tape, transparent tape, glue, mucilage;
- Comestibles: usually on-the-go snacks and processed foods such as coffee, bottled water, cookies, candy, chips, pretzels, trail mixes, and other snacks
- Janitorial supplies: mops, buckets, wastebaskets, recycling bins, brooms, soap, air fresheners, disinfectants, detergents, paper towels, and toilet paper;
- Merchant supplies: price tags; time clocks; credit card processing machines and cash registers;
- Small machines: hole punches, rubber stamps, numbering machines, staplers, pencil sharpeners, and laminators;
- Containers: binders, envelopes, boxes, crates, shelves, presentation folders, and desk organizers;
- Writing pads and books: notebooks, composition books, legal pads, and steno pads;
- Writing utensils and corrections: pens, pencils, paints, markers, correction fluid, correction tape, and erasers;

Common supplies and office equipment items before the advent of suitably priced word processing machines and PCs in the 1970s and 1980s were: typewriters, slide rules, calculators, adding machines, carbon- and carbonless paper.

Some vendors in the office supply industry may provide ancillary services for businesses, such as copy centers, printing and binding services. Some vendors may provide services for shipping, including packaging and bulk mailing.

=== Market size ===
The global office supplies market, valued at US$151.46 billion in 2022, is projected to witness a 2.1% compound annual growth rate (CAGR) from 2023 to 2030. The industry's expansion is attributed to the flourishing global services sector and increased product consumption in education. Rising environmental consciousness is driving consumers towards sustainable sourcing, production, and packaging to minimize carbon footprint. However, the COVID-19 crisis adversely affected the market, with lockdowns and social distancing measures leading to decreased demand for traditional office supplies in corporate settings worldwide.

According to UnivDatos, the global office supplies market was valued at more than US$126 billion in 2020 and is expected to grow at a CAGR of around 2% from 2022 to 2028. In 2025, North American stationary products generated around 28.3 billion USD with specifically eco-friendly stationary products.

== See also ==
- List of stationery topics
- List of office supply companies in the United States
