= Ruler =

Instrument used to measure distances

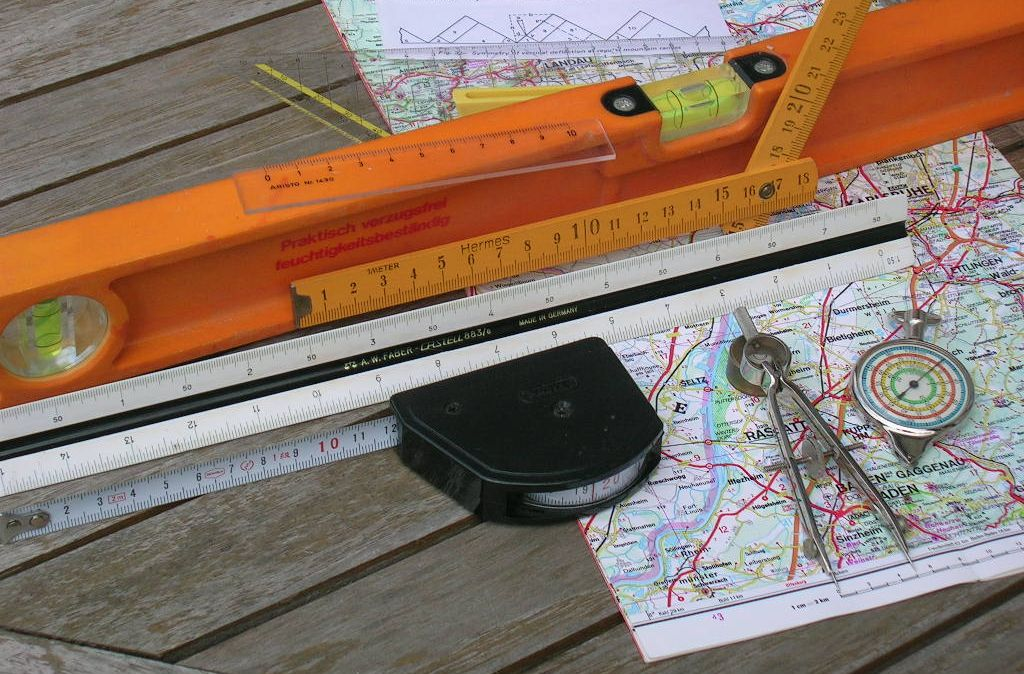
A variety of rulers

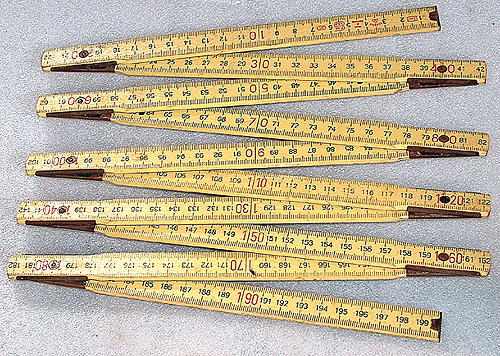
A carpenter's rule

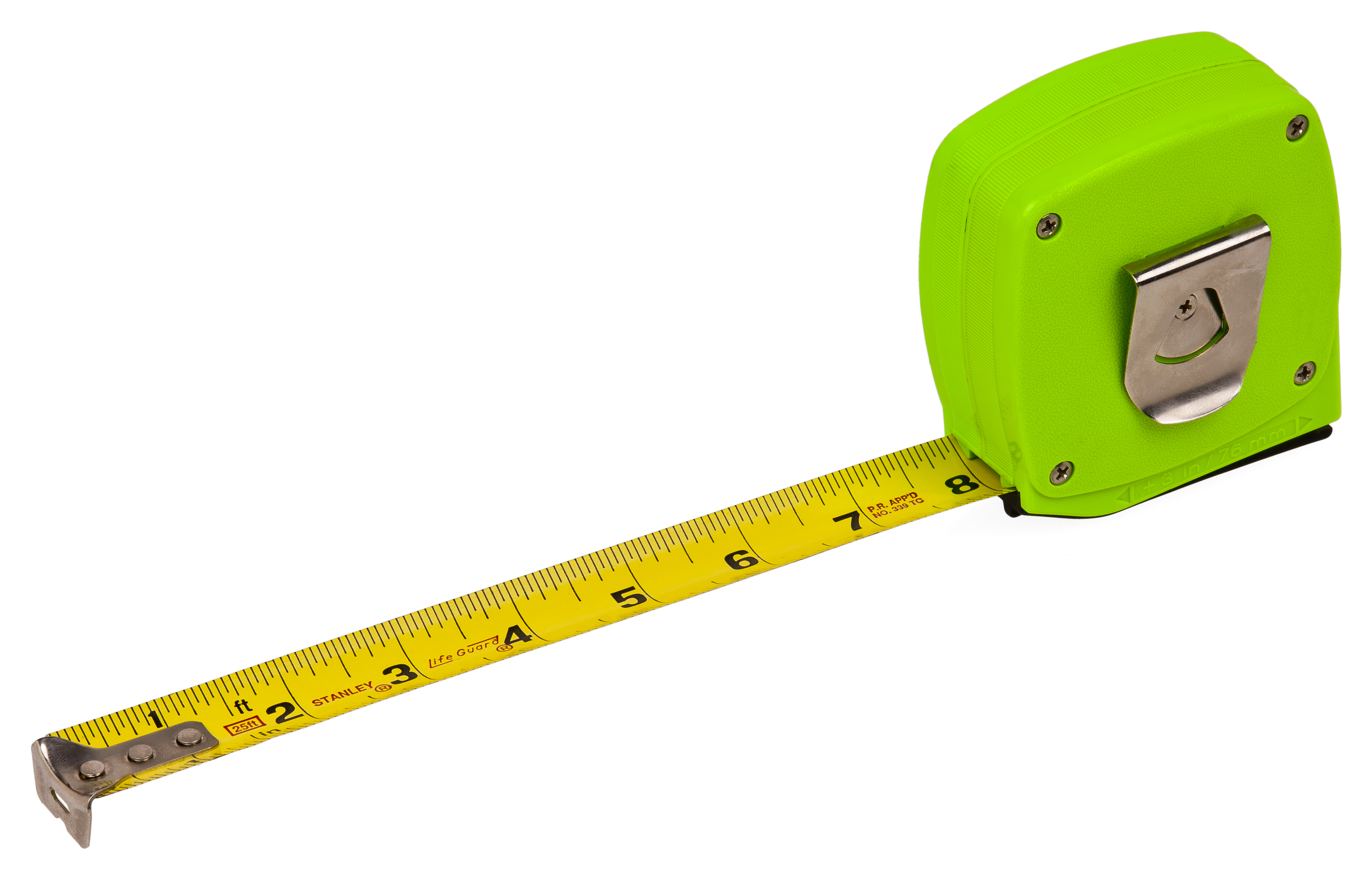
Retractable flexible rule or tape measure

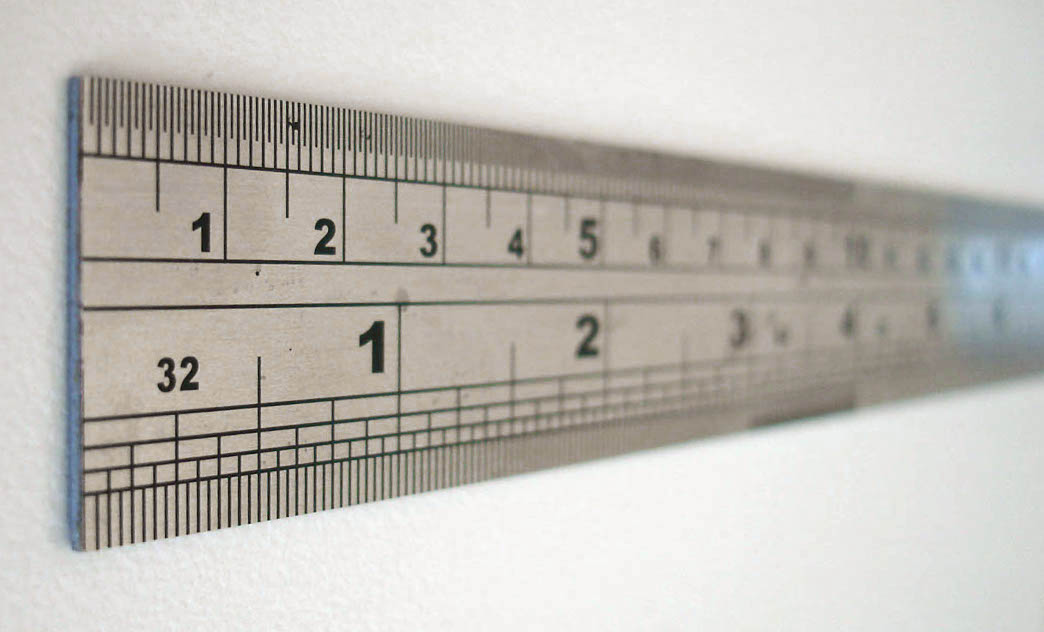
A closeup of a steel ruler

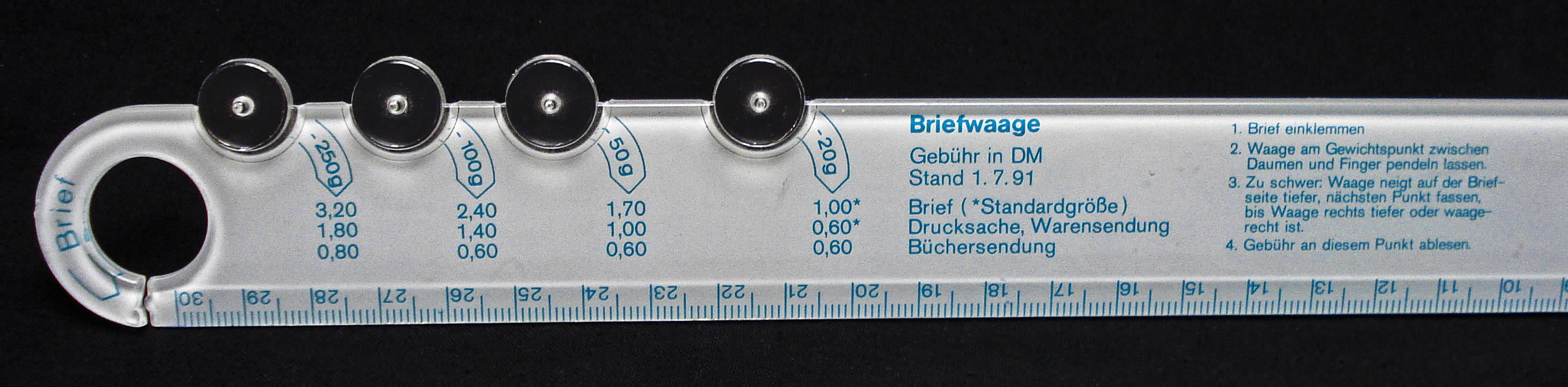
A ruler in combination with a letter scale

A ruler is an instrument used to make length measurements, whereby a length is read from a series of markings called "rules" along an edge of the device. Alternatively, it is called a rule, scale, line gauge, or metre/meter stick. Usually, the instrument is rigid and the edge itself is a straightedge ("ruled straightedge"), which additionally allows one to draw straighter lines. Rulers are an important tool in geometry, geography and mathematics. They have been used since at least 2650 BC.

== Variants ==
Rulers have long been made from different materials and in multiple sizes. Historically, they were mainly wood but plastics have also been used. They can be created with length markings instead of being scribed. Metal is also used for more durable rulers for use in the workshop; sometimes a raised metal edge is embedded into a wooden desk ruler to preserve the edge when used for straight-line cutting and to prevent ink from feathering under the ruler when used to draw a straight line with a pen. Typically 12 in (30 cm) in length, though some can go up to 100 cm (39 in), it is useful for a ruler to be on a desk or workstation to help in drawing. Shorter rulers are convenient for keeping in a pocket. Longer rulers (e.g. 18 in (46 cm)) are necessary in some cases, some examples being the yardsticks and meter sticks. Historically, long measuring rods were used for larger projects, now superseded by the tape measure, the surveyor's wheel or laser rangefinders.

== Use in geometry ==
In geometry, a straightedge (ruler without any rules on it) can be used to draw straight lines between points. A ruler is also used to draw accurate graphs and tables.

Ruler and compass construction is a geometric construction method for producing lengths, angles, and other geometric figures using only a ruler and a compass. It is possible to bisect an angle into two equal parts with a ruler and compass. It is, however, impossible to do angle trisection, unless two marks are allowed on the ruler, allowing the problem to be solved via neusis.

== History ==
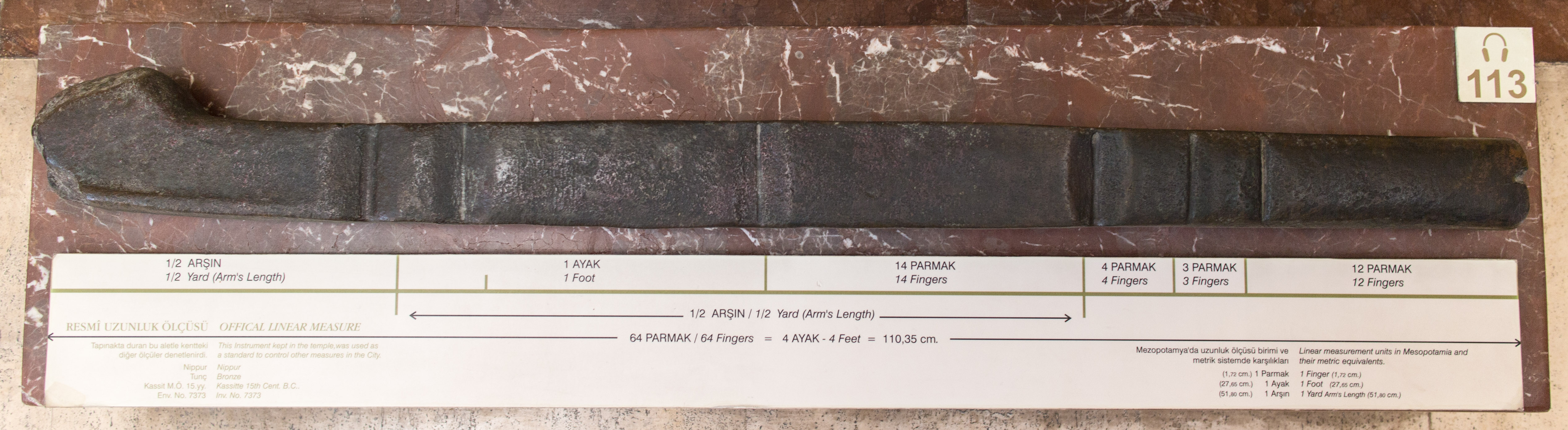
The Nippur cubit-rod, c. 2650 BC, in the Archeological Museum of Istanbul, Turkey

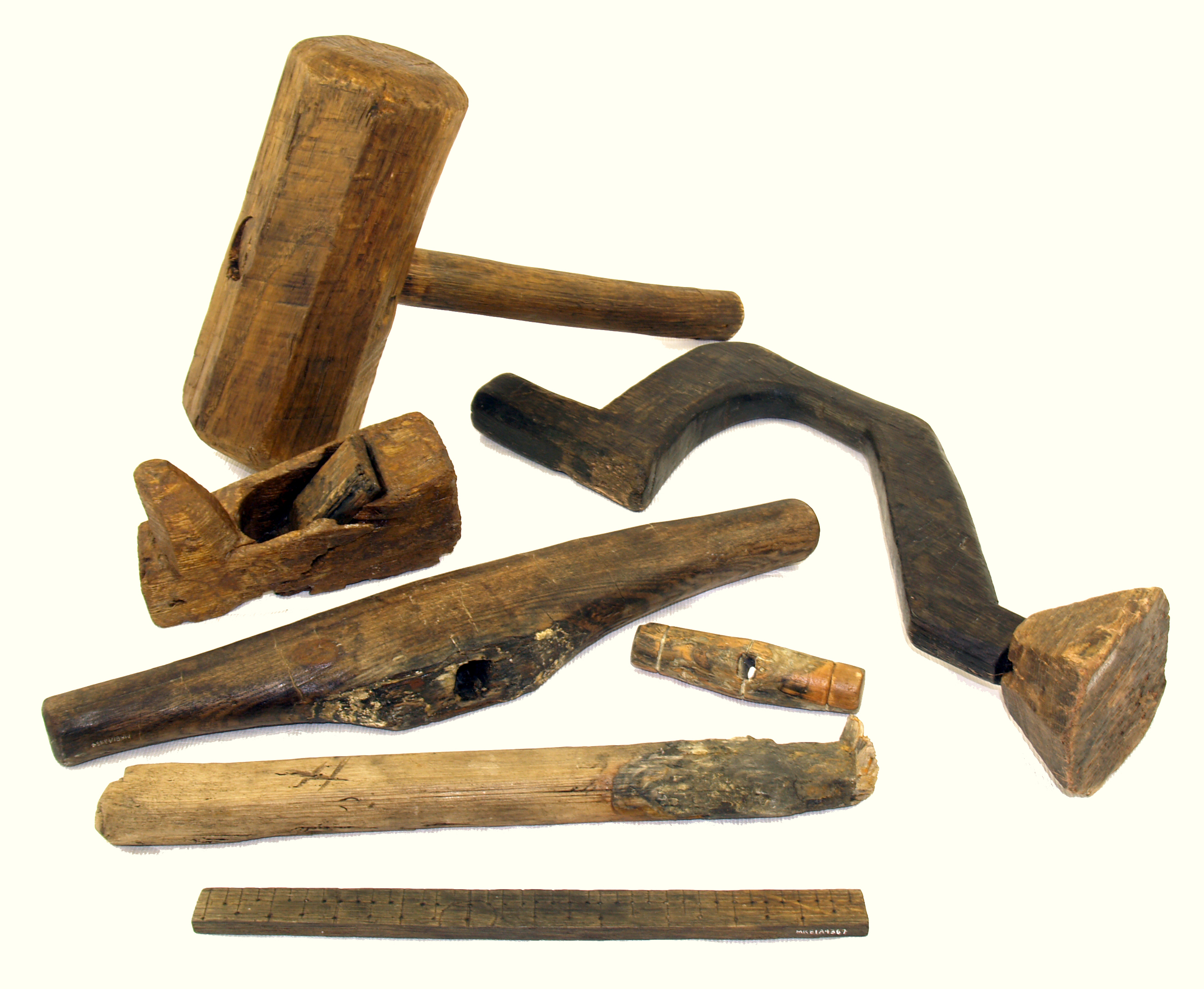
A wooden carpenter's rule and other tools found on board the 16th-century carrack Mary Rose

In the history of measurement many distance units have been used which were based on the human body such as the cubit, hand and foot, and these units varied in length by era and location. In the late 18th century, the metric system came into use and has since been adopted to varying degrees in almost all countries around the world.

The oldest preserved measuring rod is a copper-alloy bar that dates from c. 2650 BC and was found by the German Assyriologist Eckhard Unger while excavating at the Sumerian city of Nippur (present-day Iraq).

Rulers made of ivory were in use by the Indus Valley Civilization period prior to 1500 BC. Excavations at Lothal (2400 BC) have yielded one such ruler calibrated to about 1.6 millimetres (1/16 in). Ian Whitelaw holds that the Mohenjo-Daro ruler is divided into units corresponding to 33.5 millimetres (1.32 in) and these are marked out in decimal subdivisions with amazing accuracy, to within 0.13 millimetres (0.005 in). Ancient bricks found throughout the region have dimensions that correspond to these units.

Anton Ullrich invented the folding ruler in 1851. Frank Hunt later made the flexible ruler in 1902.

== Curved and flexible rulers ==
The equivalent of a ruler for drawing or reproducing a smooth curve, where it takes the form of a rigid template, is known as a French curve. A flexible device that can be bent to the desired shape is known as a flat spline, or (in its more modern incarnation) a flexible curve. Historically, a flexible lead rule used by masons that could be bent to the curves of a molding was known as a lesbian rule.

== Philosophy ==
Ludwig Wittgenstein famously used rulers as an example in his discussion of language games in the Philosophical Investigations (1953). He pointed out that the standard meter bar in Paris was the criterion against which all other rulers were determined to be one meter long. However, there was no analytical way to demonstrate that the standard meter bar itself was one meter long. It could only be asserted as one meter as part of a language game.

== See also ==
- Accuracy and precision – Measures of observational error
- Dividing engine – Device for marking graduations on measuring instruments
- Golomb ruler – Set of marks along a ruler such that no two pairs of marks are the same distance apart
- Level staff – Graduated rod used to measure differences between heights
- Measuring instrument – Measuring instruments which monitor and control a process
- Measuring rod – Tool used to physically measure lengths
- Rolling ruler
- Scales:
  - Architect's scale – Tool used for measuring at a fixed ratio
  - Metric scale – Tool used for measuring at a fixed ratio and
  - Engineer's scale – Tool used for measuring at a fixed ratio
- Significant figures – Digit necessary to represent a quantity
- Technical drawing tool – Tools and instruments used for accurate and precise manual drafting

== Bibliography ==
- Cherry, Dan. "Collector's guide to rules", Furniture & Cabinetmaking, no. 259, July 2017, ISSN 1365-4292, pp. 52–6
- Rees, Jane and Mark (2010). The Rule Book: Measuring for the Trades. Lakeville, MN: Astragal Press ISBN 978-1-931626-26-2 OCLC 907853704
- Russell, David R.; with photography by James Austin and foreword by David Linley (2010). Antique Woodworking Tools: Their Craftsmanship from the Earliest Times to the Twentieth Century, Cambridge: John Adamson ISBN 978-1-898565-05-5 OCLC 727125586, pp. 64–74
- Whitelaw, Ian (2007). A Measure of All Things: The Story of Man and Measurement. Macmillan ISBN 0-312-37026-1 OCLC 938084552
