= John Cuff =

John Cuff may refer to:

- John Cuff (baseball) (1864–1916), American baseball player
- John Cuff (optician) (1708–1772), English scientific instrument maker
- John Cuff (politician) (1805–1864), New Zealand politician
