= Abraham Trembley =

Genevan naturalist (1710–1784)

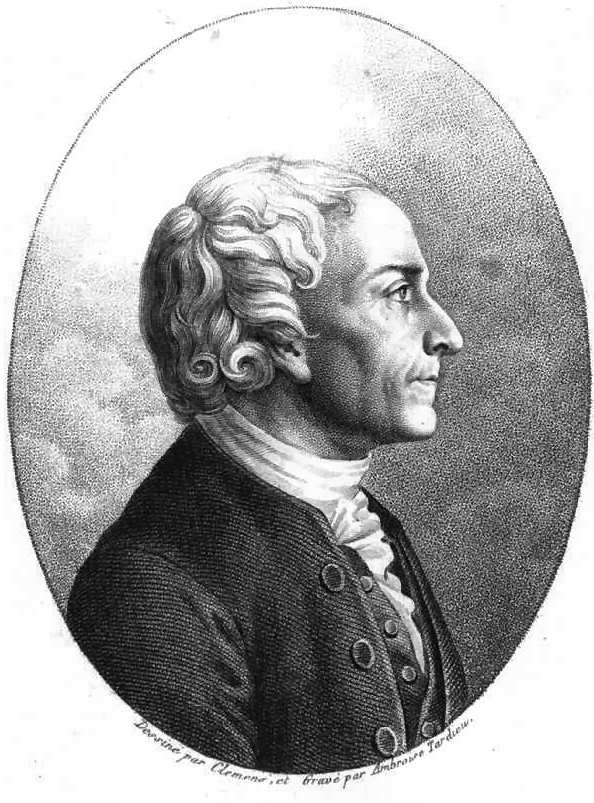
- Abraham Trembley
- Born: 3 September 1710; Geneva
- Died: 12 May 1784 (aged 73); Geneva
- Known for: Hydra (genus)
- Awards: Copley Medal, 1743
- Scientific career
- Fields: Naturalist

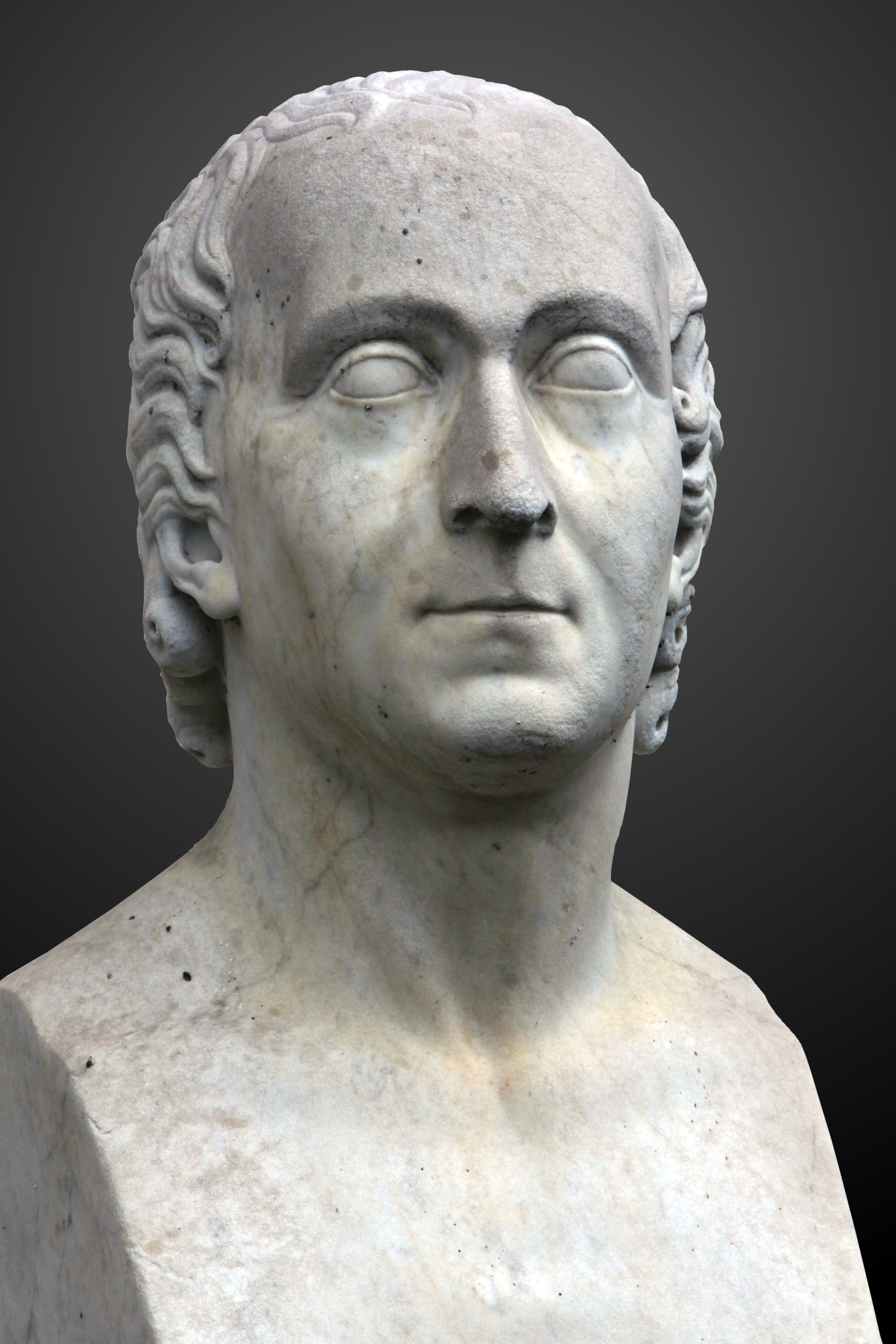
Bust of Abraham Trembley, on display on the grounds of the Geneva Botanical Garden.

Abraham Trembley (3 September 1710 – 12 May 1784 Geneva) was a Genevan naturalist. He is best known for being the first to study freshwater polyps or hydra and for being among the first to develop experimental zoology. His mastery of experimental method has led some historians of science to credit him as the "father of biology".

He also wrote on religion and morals.

== Biography ==
Trembley came from an officer's family from Geneva, Republic of Geneva. He was related to Charles Bonnet, with whom he corresponded regularly, and befriended with René-Antoine Ferchault de Réaumur (1683–1757) and Lazzaro Spallanzani (1729–1799). Trembley acted as tutor to the two children of Count Willem Bentinck van Rhoon (1704–1774), a prominent Dutch politician at the time. The boys were 3 and 6 when Trembley, during lessons in which he went fishing in the ponds outside the house, accidentally discovered the regenerative powers of the Hydra. Those lessons took place at the Count's summer residence of Sorgvliet nearby The Hague. Sketches and drawings of his experiments with the children, made by Cornelis Pronk, are kept in the archives of the town of The Hague, the Netherlands.

== Work on Hydra ==
While Trembley thought he had discovered a new species, Leeuwenhoek had in fact first published on Hydra in a 1702–1703 volume of Philosophical Transactions of the Royal Society, describing them as a type of "animalculum". In his work Leeuwenhoek clearly described the process of budding, as well as their tentacles' contractility and the presence of cnidocyte batteries on tentacles.

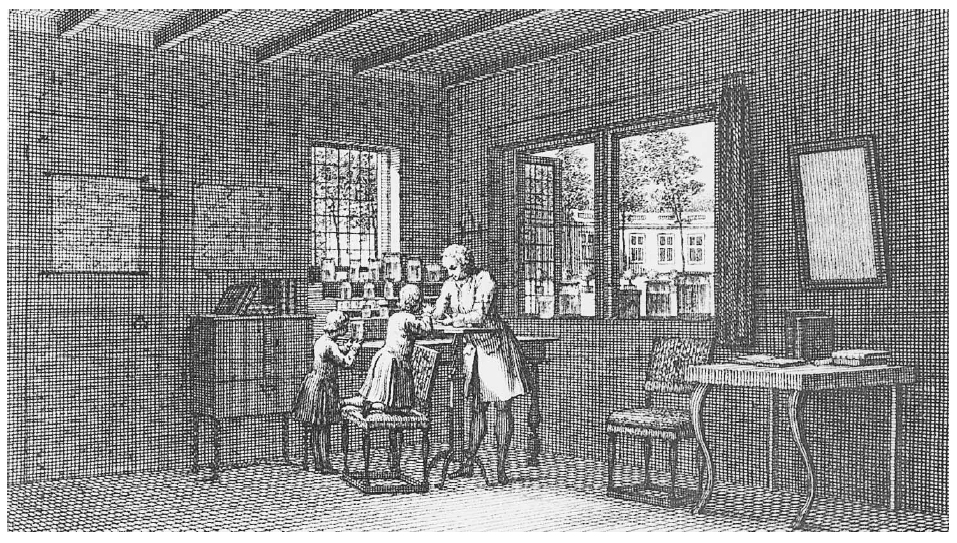
Trembley's laboratory at Zorgvlied, as depicted in his 1744 book. Judging from his correspondence, though, his laboratory was in fact much more crowded with objects, such as up to 140 jars.

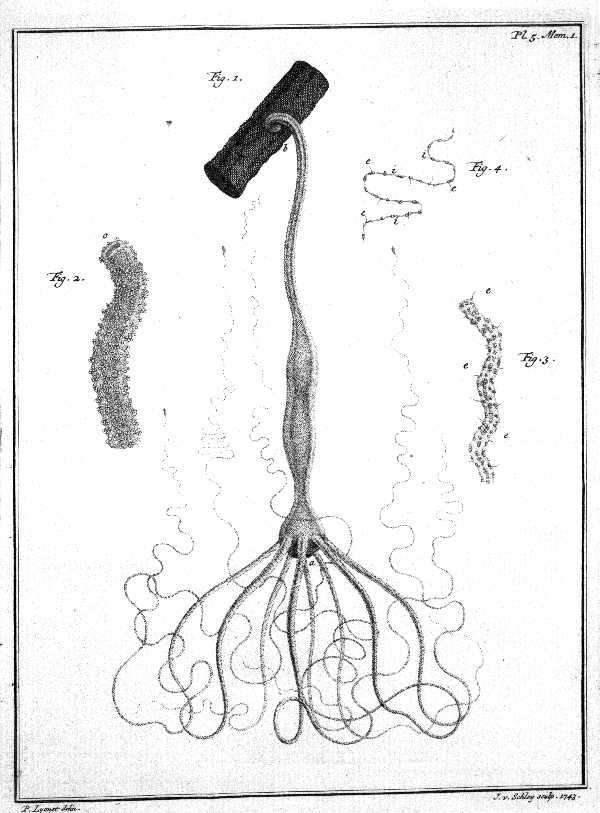
A Hydra as depicted in Trembley's 1744 book.

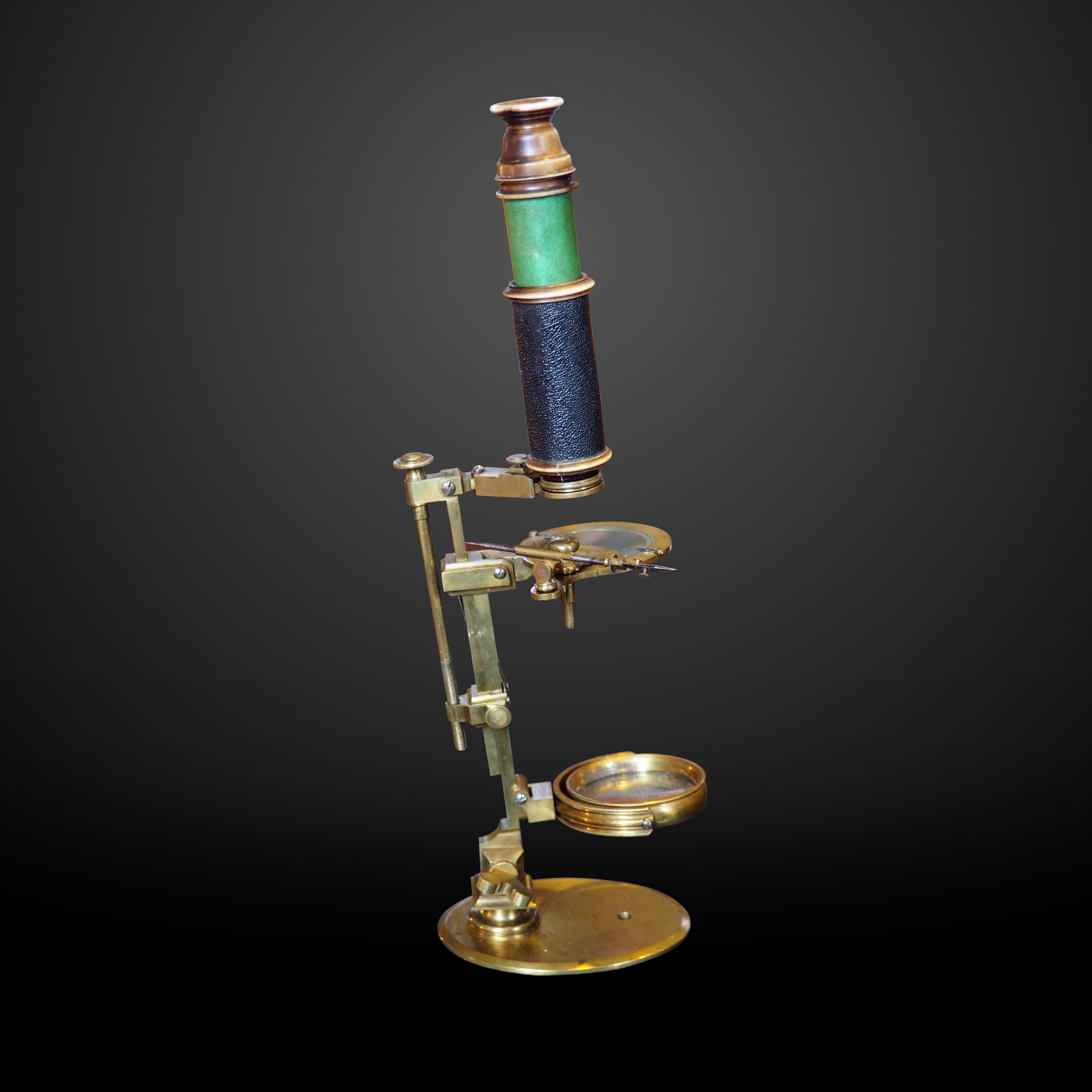
The aquatic microscope made by John Cuff for Trembley, on display at Musée d'histoire des sciences de la Ville de Genève

Trembley's findings were published in a groundbreaking book in 1744, Mémoires pour servir à l'histoire d'un genre de polypes d'eau douce, Gebr. Verbeek, Leiden, translated into German in 1775 as Abhandlungen zur Geschichte einer Polypenart des süssen Wassers. The book includes some of the (engraved) drawings of Pronk. His discoveries led to his membership of the prestigious Royal Society in London and a correspondent member of the académie des sciences in France. He became also recipient of the Copley medal.

Some attribute Trembley as being the first to study stem cells, although he obviously did not refer to them as such. Trembley did however make note of their incredible regenerative capacity.

== Works ==
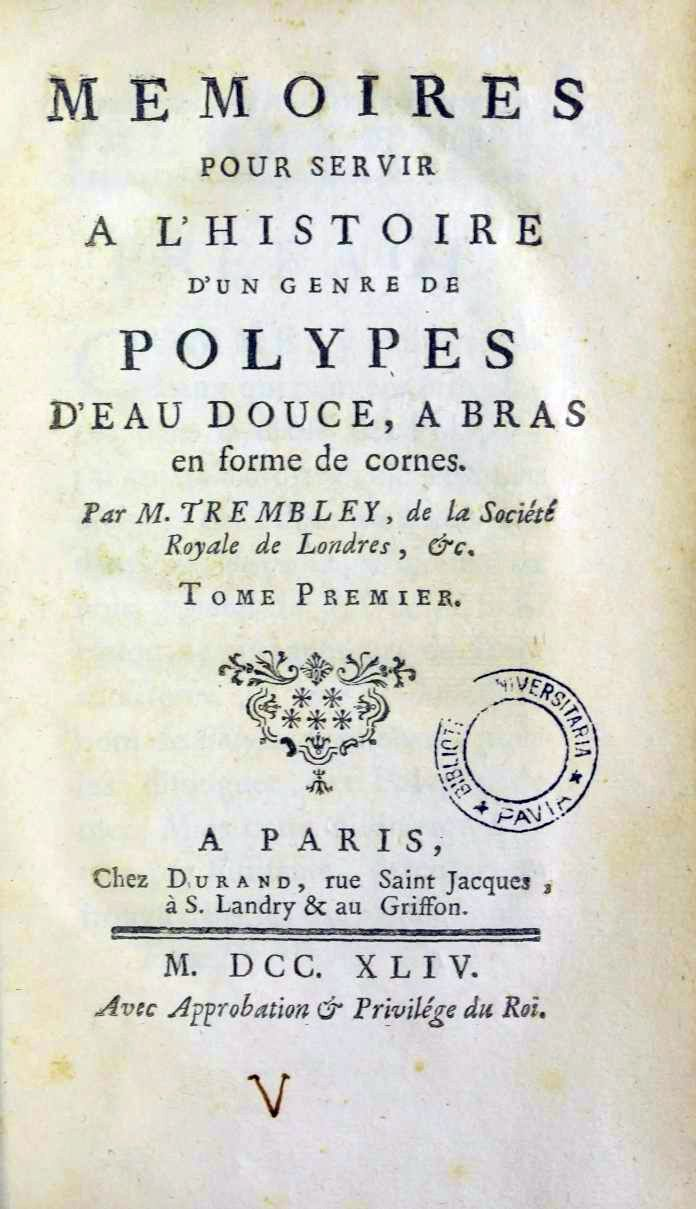
Memoires pour servir a l'histoire d'un genre de polypes d'eau douce, 1744

- Memoires pour servir a l'histoire d'un genre de polypes d'eau douce (in French). Paris: Laurent Durand. 1744.
