= Beam compass =

Type of circle-drawing compass

A beam compass is a compass with a beam and sliding sockets or cursors for drawing and dividing circles larger than those made by a regular pair of compasses. The instrument can be as a whole, or made on the spot with individual sockets (called trammel points) and any suitable beam.

== Draftsman's beam compass ==
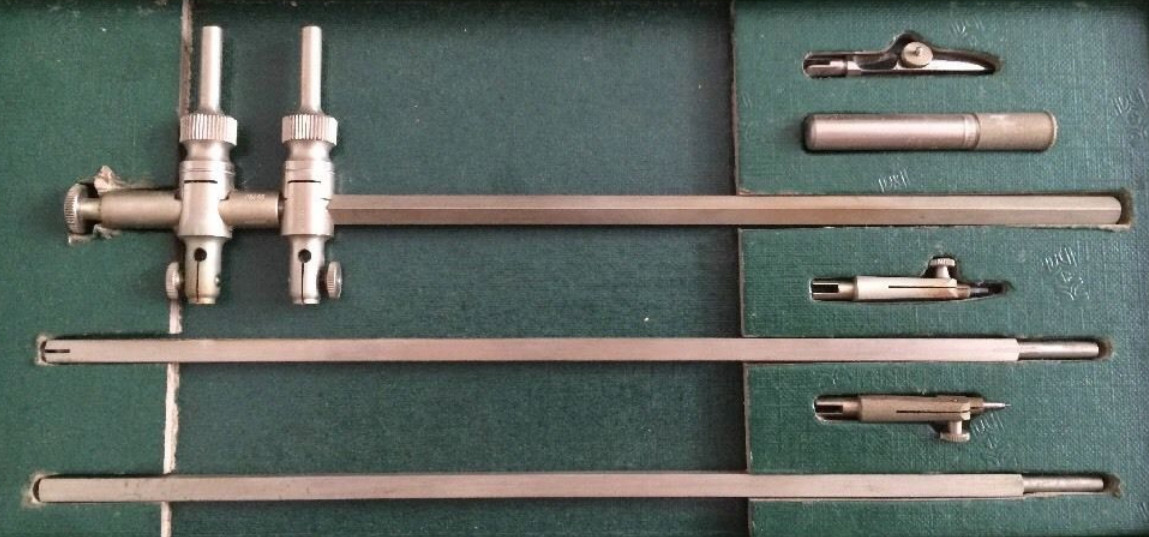
Keuffel & Esser Arrow Beam Compass Set for Drafting.

A draftsman's beam compass consists of a set of points and holders, mounted on a plated brass, aluminum, or German 'silver' rod. One end is generally locked down at the end of the rod, while the other has both rough and fine adjustments, though some are opposite in construction. The locked tip holder consists of a needle, for the centre of the radius, and the other holds either a lead clutch, or an inking nib. There are older variants which use a wooden beam. Another similar type is a Machinist or Engineers beam compass, which uses scribing points only, similar to ones used by woodworkers, except that its fine adjustment is generally more refined. These beam compasses can be extended by adding press-in rods, or by using a lockable rod connector.

== Woodworking trammel points ==
Trammels or trammel points are the sockets or cursors that, together with the beam, make up a beam compass. Their relatively small size makes them easy to store or transport. They consist of two separate metal pieces (approx. 2 1/2 in × 5 in × 1/2 in (6 cm × 13 cm × 1 cm)) that are usually connected by a piece of wood, The wood timber is not included in the purchase of the trammel points. It can be ripped on a table saw. A lumber yard or woodworking store should have a piece readily available to fit the opening also, metal or pipe. They work like a scratch awl.

== Use ==
As for any compass, there are two uses.

=== Scribing a circle ===
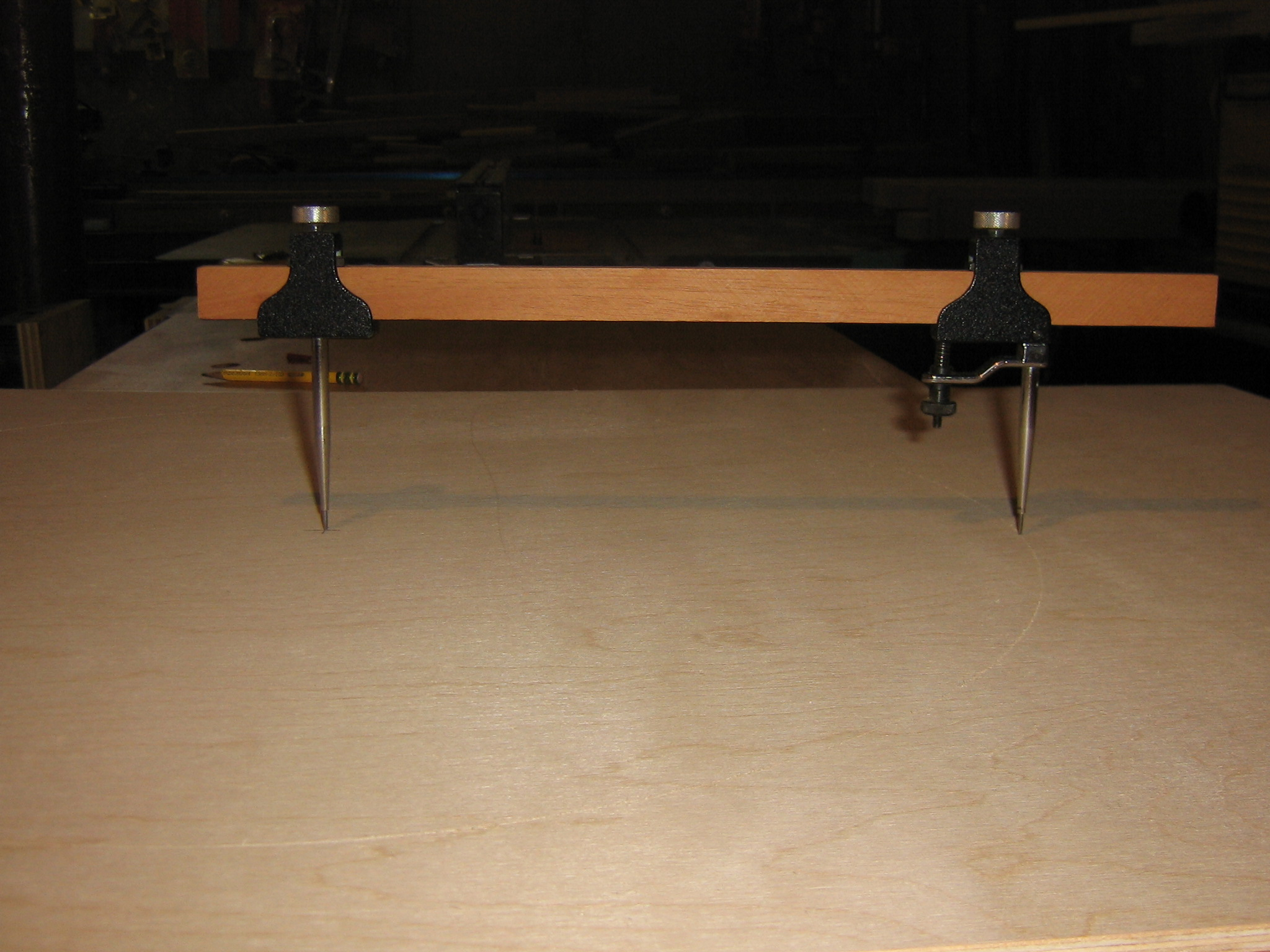
sharp point used to score a fine line in the birch plywood connected to each other by a piece of 3/4" × 3/8" mahogany

The beam compass is used to scribe a circle, either by drawing with lead, penning by ink, or scratching with a sharpened point. The radius can be adjusted by sliding the metal point holder across a wood beam or metal rod, and locking it by turning a knob at the desired location. Some have a fine radius adjustment. The threaded adjustment is similar to that of a Screw. The only limitation is the rigidity of the wood beam or metal rod being used. Longer wooden beams tend to sag depending on the species of wood used. Metal rods can be used as an alternative, but they also have length limitations. Some trammel sets include a support roller for attachment at mid span of the beam or rod, to take out the sag. Trammel points score a precise line by using a sharpened point, or draw a line using a lead clutch, or an ink nib. When the circular knob is turned, it micro adjusts the radius of the circle. On some, a spring and screw mechanism locks the compass at the precise desired location. Turning clockwise decreases the radius while turning counterclockwise increases the radius slightly.

=== Transferring measurements ===
A beam compass can also be used to make a series of repetitive measurements in a precise manner; the same as using a divider. Each point is rotated 180° along a straight line or large circle, and this process is repeated until the desired measurement or division is reached. The indentation created by the sharp point of the trammel is easily seen and makes a precise point to reference to the next location.

== Variants ==
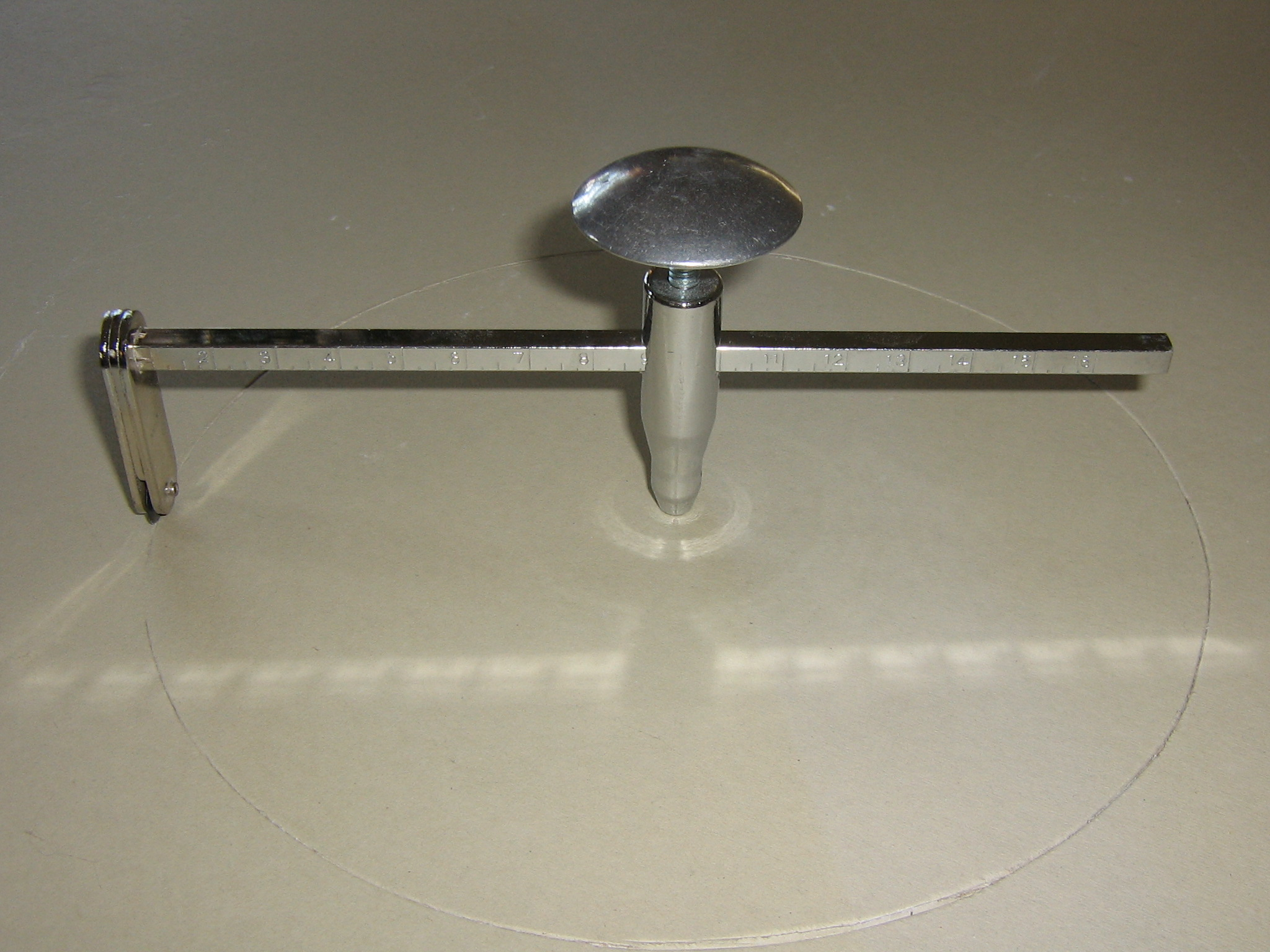
Circle cutter used to score drywall.

The circle cutter is a basic variation of the beam compass. There are many types of circle cutters. This cutter is used primarily to score a circular pattern in the drywall to fit over recessed lighting in the ceiling. The tool consists of a square shank with a sliding pivot that is locked into the desired location with a turn knob. The shank is graduated into 16 units and each unit is further divided into increments of one quarter. One end of the shank has a fixed cutter wheel that scores a fine line in the drywall.

== See also ==
- Technical drawing tools
