= John Cuff (optician) =

English scientific instrument maker (c. 1708 – c. 1772)

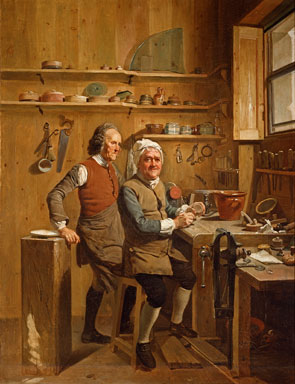
John Cuff, by Johan Zoffany (1772)

John Cuff (c. 1708 – c. 1772) was an important English scientific instrument maker, particularly of microscopes.

He was apprenticed to the optical instrument maker James Mann. Cuff eventually set up his own establishment as a "Spectacle and Microscope Maker, At the sign of the Reflecting Microscope and Spectacles opposite Serjeant's Inn" "(1737-57) & Double Microscope, three Pairs of Golden Spectacles & Hadley's Quadrant opposite Salisbury Court (1757-8) both in Fleet St & Strand, all in London, England." In 1743, he advertised that he made and sold "Wholesale and Retale, all Manner of curious Optical Instruments".

Cuff failed to gain membership in the Royal Society, but at a Society meeting in the winter of 1738–1739, he encountered Johann Nathanael Lieberkühn, a German physician who was promoting two microscopes of his own invention. Cuff soon made improvements to the designs. In 1745, the Swiss naturalist Abraham Trembley visited London and asked him to design a microscope that would make it easier to observe aquatic creatures as they were moving about. Two years later, Cuff produced the "aquatic microscope", "invented by him for the Examination of Water Animals."

The naturalist Henry Baker complained to him about the shortcomings of Baker's Culpeper-type microscope: "Pulling the body of the Instrument up and down was likewise subject to Jerks, which caused a Difficulty in fixing it exactly at the Focus: there was also no good Contrivance for viewing opake Objects". Under Baker's direction, Cuff designed and produced an improved "Double Microscope" that quickly supplanted the Culpeper type and became much sought-after not only in England but all over Europe. While superior to other microscopes of the time, optically it was no improvement, and like them, it still "suffered from severe chromatic and spherical aberration."

Unfortunately, Cuff was apparently not much of a businessman: despite Baker's support, he had to declare bankruptcy in 1750. In 1757, Benjamin Martin opened a competing shop next door to Cuff's establishment on Fleet Street and drove him out of business the following year.

According to the Royal Collection Trust, the German painter Johan Zoffany was commissioned by King George III, a purchaser of Cuff's microscopes, to depict him. However, doubts have been expressed whether the painting titled John Cuff actually is a portrayal of him, and it has also been known as The Lapidaries or Two Old Men.

Instruments by Cuff
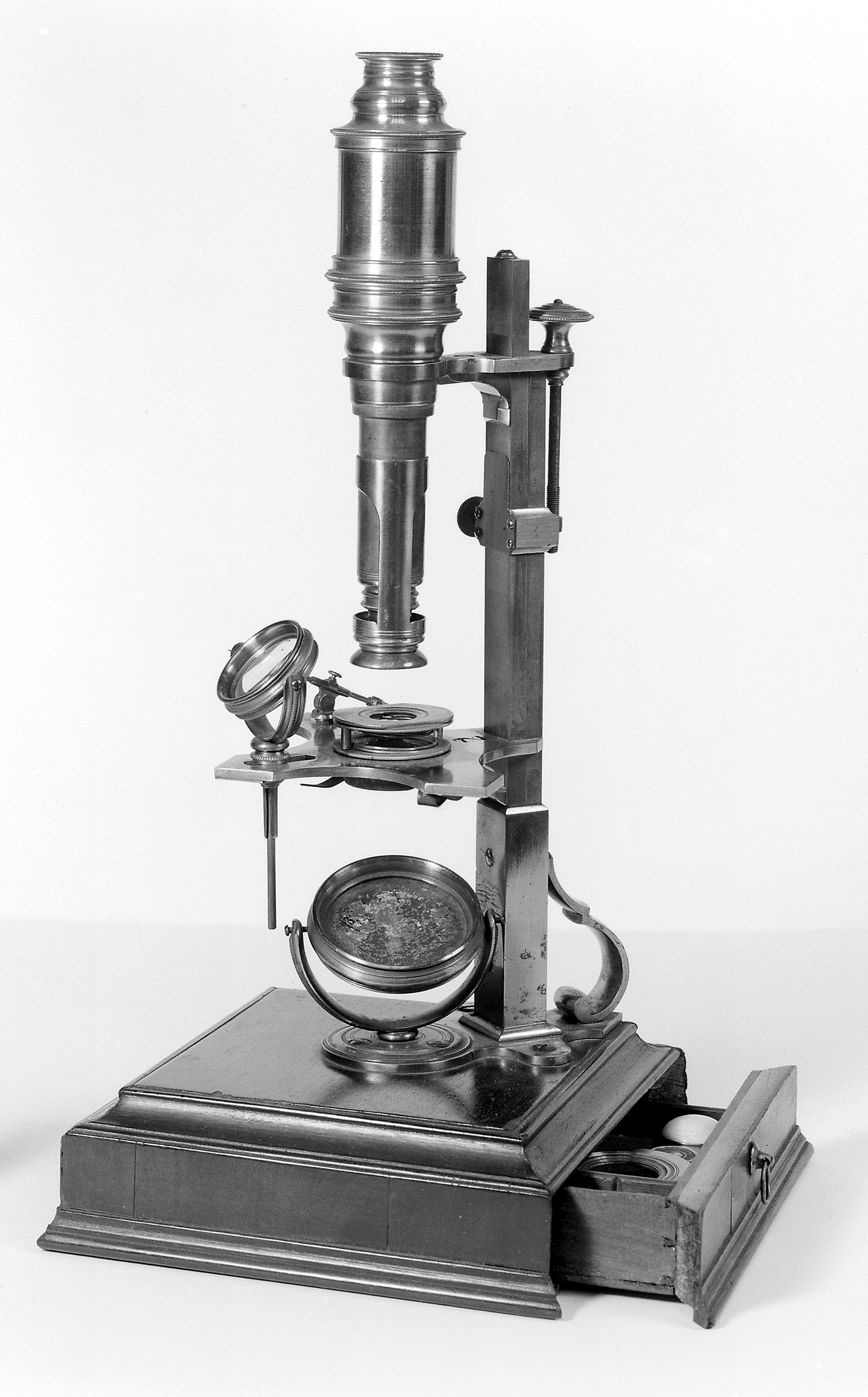
A compound microscope by Cuff, image from the Wellcome Trust

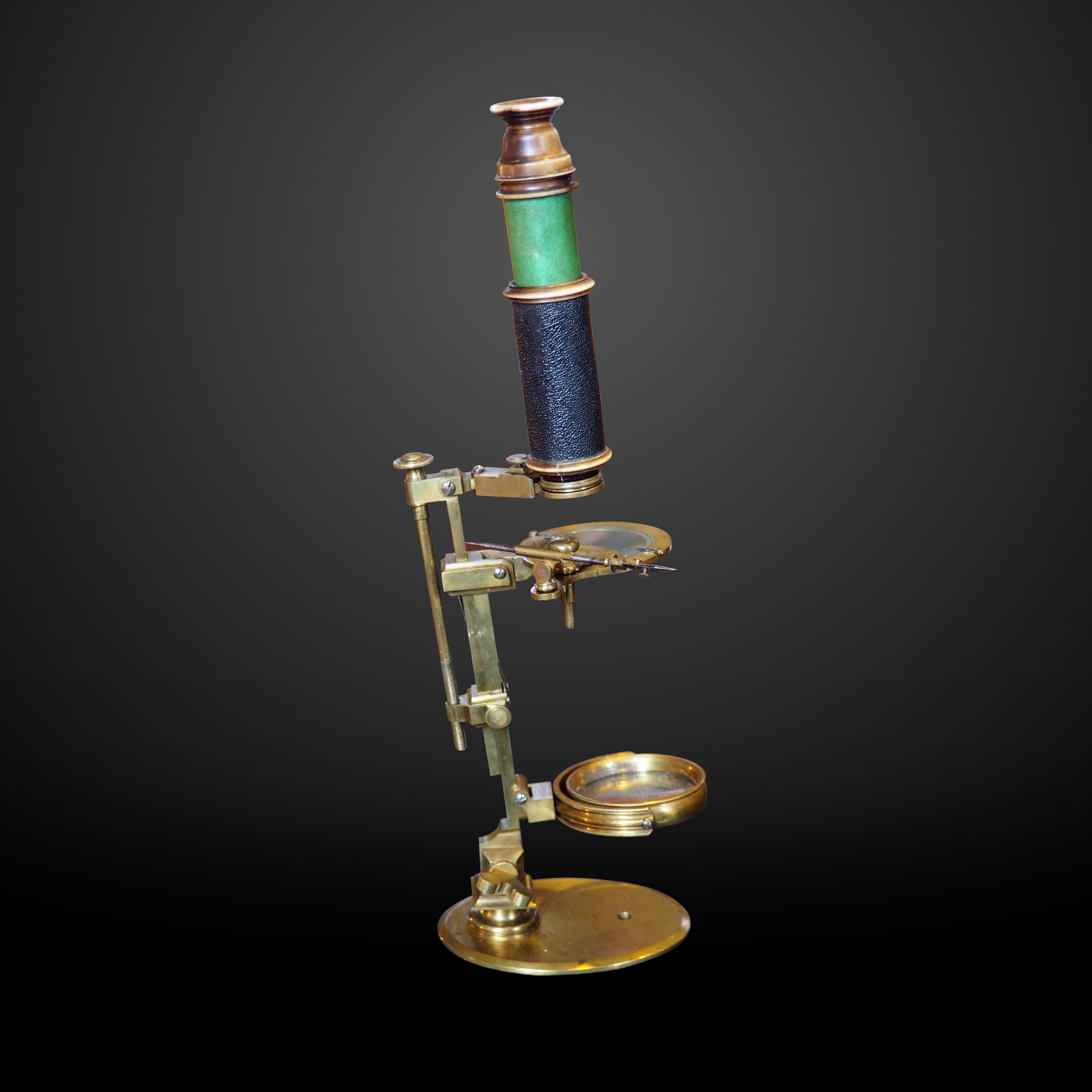
The aquatic microscope made by Cuff for Abraham Trembley, on display at Musée d'histoire des sciences de la Ville de Genève

== Museum holdings ==
Cuff's instruments are found in several major collections of scientific instruments, including:

- Science Museum, London, England: 61 objects
- Whipple Museum of the History of Science, Cambridge, England: five microscopes
- Museo Galileo, Florence, Italy: two microscopes
- Golub Collection, University of California, Berkeley, United States: one compound microscope
- National Museum of American History, Washington, D.C., United States: a 1752 aquatic microscope
- Musée d'histoire des sciences de la Ville de Genève, Geneva, Switzerland: an aquatic microscope.
