= Pierre-Jules Delespine =

French architect (1756–1825)

Nicolas Pierre-Jules Delespine (31 October 1756, Paris – 16 September 1825, Paris) was a French architect.

== Biography ==
He came from a long line of architects, which included his father, Louis-Jules Delespine (1726-1796). After learning all he could at home, he continued his studies with Antoine-François Peyre and Jean-Augustin Renard.

From 1800 until his death, he was a professor at the École des beaux-arts, and served as a member of the École's jury. His workshop enjoyed a high reputation. Several of his students were winners of the Prix de Rome for architecture: Félix Callet (1819), Abel Blouet (1821), Marie-Antoine Delannoy (1828), and Pierre-Joseph Garrez (1830)

He was a member of the Council for Civic Buildings and, in 1824, became a member of the Académie des Beaux-Arts. There, he took Seat #1 for architecture, succeeding Maximilien Joseph Hurtault, deceased.

In addition to his official work, he built hotels and inns on the Rue de Rivoli and the Marché des Blancs-Manteaux. He also worked on restorations at the Church of Saint-Roch and the Hôtel de Ville in Rouen.

== Sources ==
- Charles Gabet, Dictionnaire des artistes de l'école française au XIXe siècle, pp. 195–196, chez Madame Vergne, Paris, 1831 (Online)
- Adolphe Lance, Dictionnaire des architectes français, Vol.1, A - K, pg.204, Vve A. Morel et Cie éditeurs, Paris, 1872
- Charles Bauchal, Nouveau dictionnaire biographique et critique des architectes français, pg.638, A. Daly fils et Cie, Pris, 1887
