= Reduction compass =

Type of compass

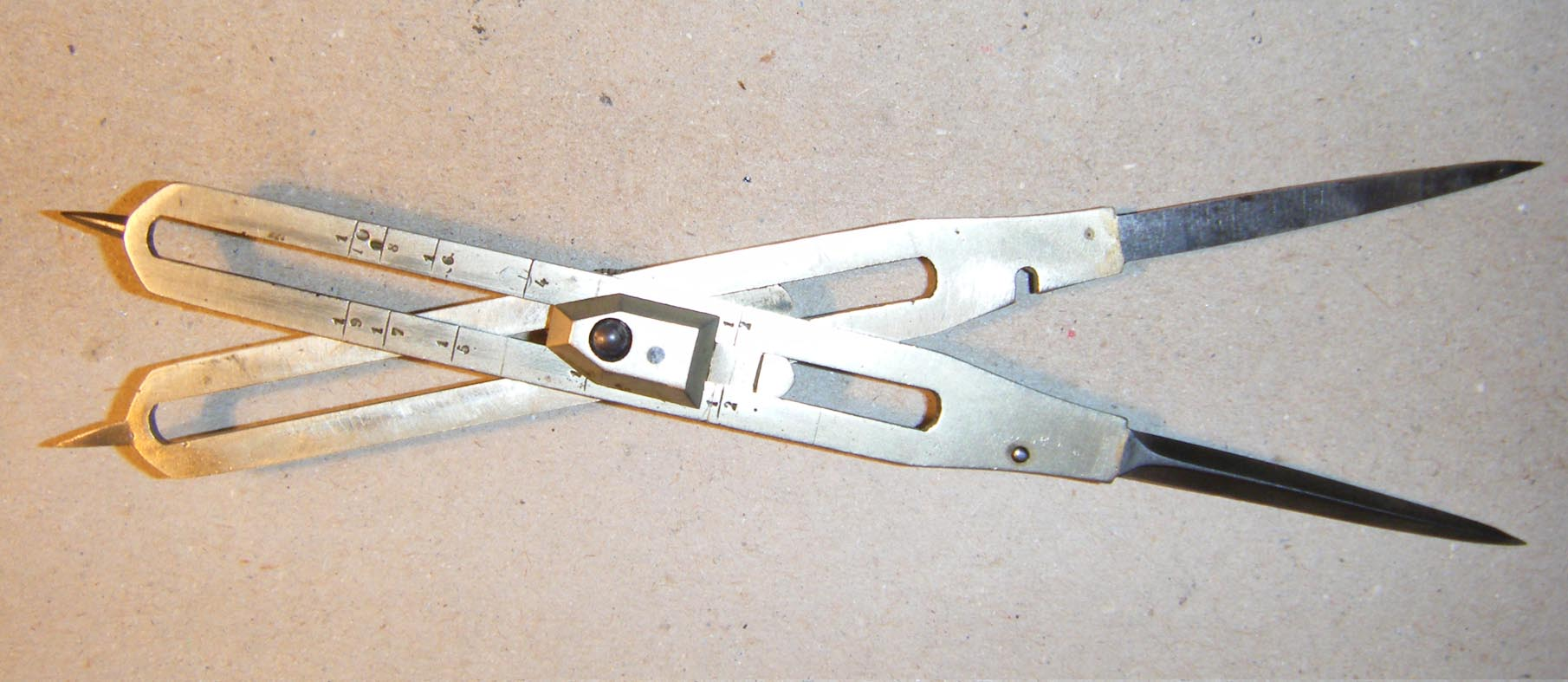
Late 19th-century reduction compass

The reduction compass or proportional dividers is a geometry tool with asymmetric-length branches to allow performing homothetic transformations, reproducing a pattern while enlarging or reducing its size and conserving angles. It was invented by Fabrizio Mordente before 1567.

== Use and principle ==
The reduction compass is made of two branches, with two points each. Several types exist, including the following:

- simple reduction compass: the pivot is fixed, and the enlargement factor is determined by the length difference between the small and long end of the branches;
- mobile-headed reduction compass: the pivot is mounted on a slide, and its position determines the enlargement factor.
Reduction compass variants

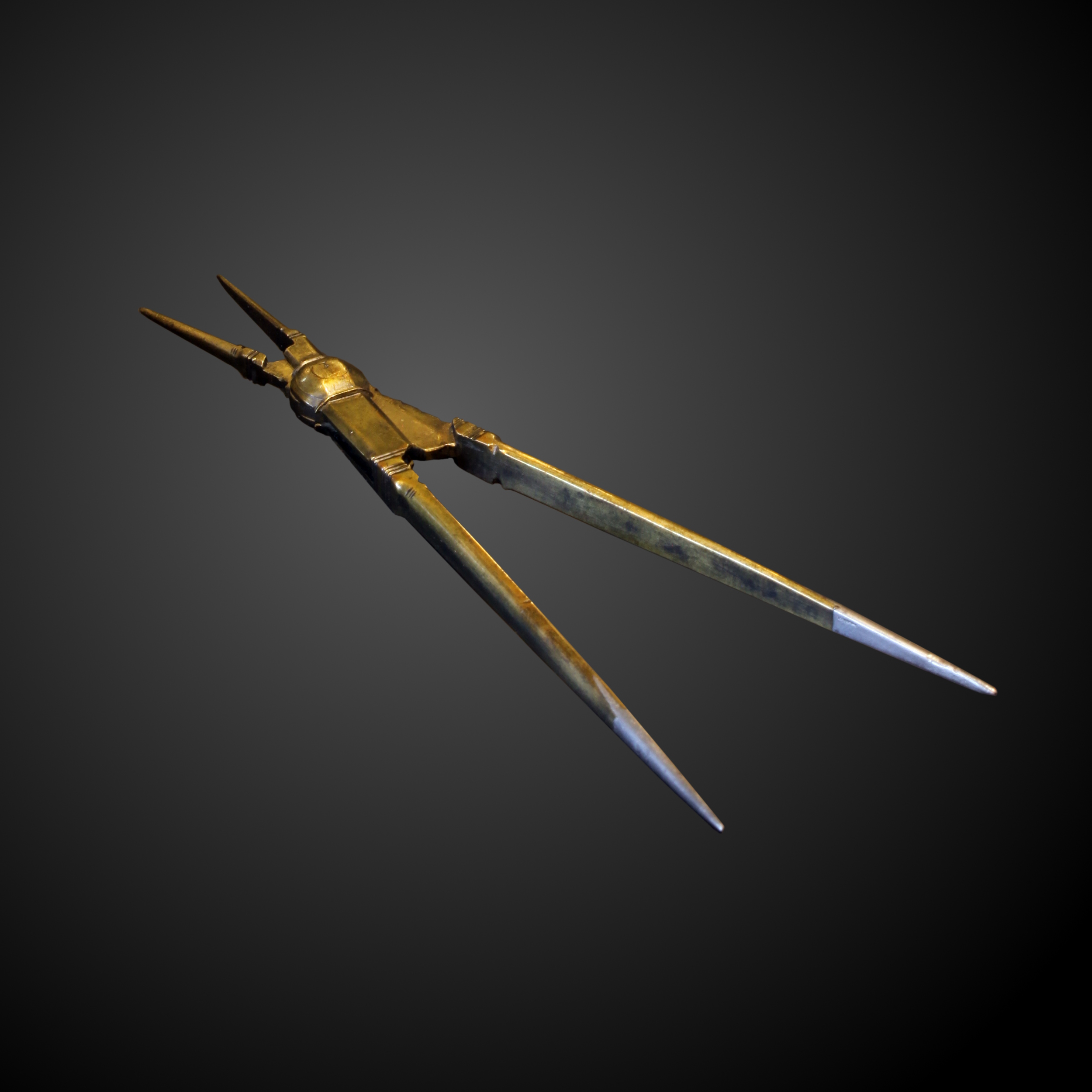
Simple reduction compass on display at the Musée d'Histoire des Sciences de la ville de Genève.

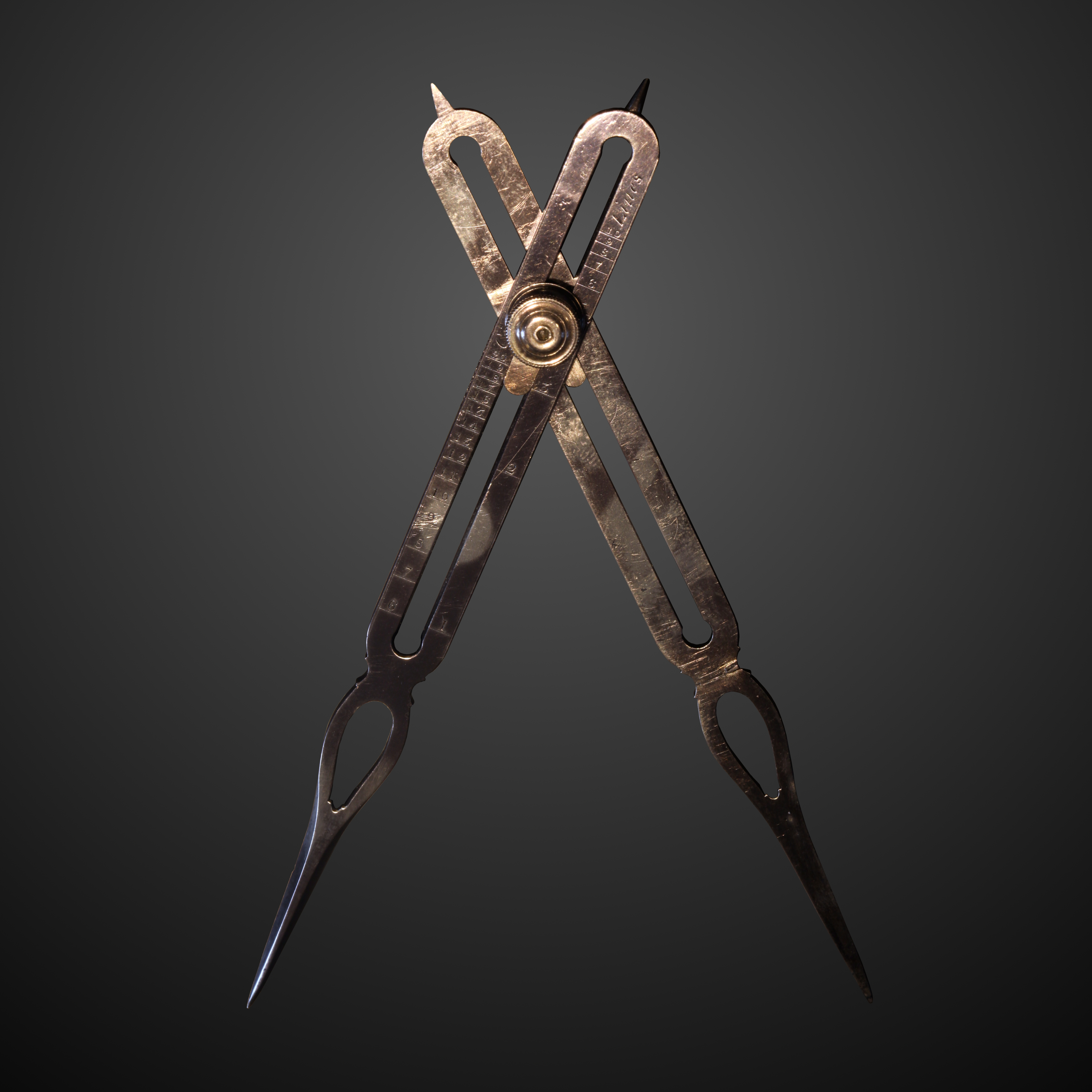
Sliding-pivot reduction compass by Nairne on London, 18th century. On display at the Musée d'Histoire des Sciences de la ville de Genève.

The underlying principle is that of proportionality of the sides of two similar isosceles triangles.

The reduction compass was customarily used in geography to change the scale of maps.
