= Musée d'histoire des sciences de la Ville de Genève =

Museum in Geneva, Switzerland

Museum of the History of Science of the City of Geneva
- Musée d'histoire des sciences de la Ville de Genève
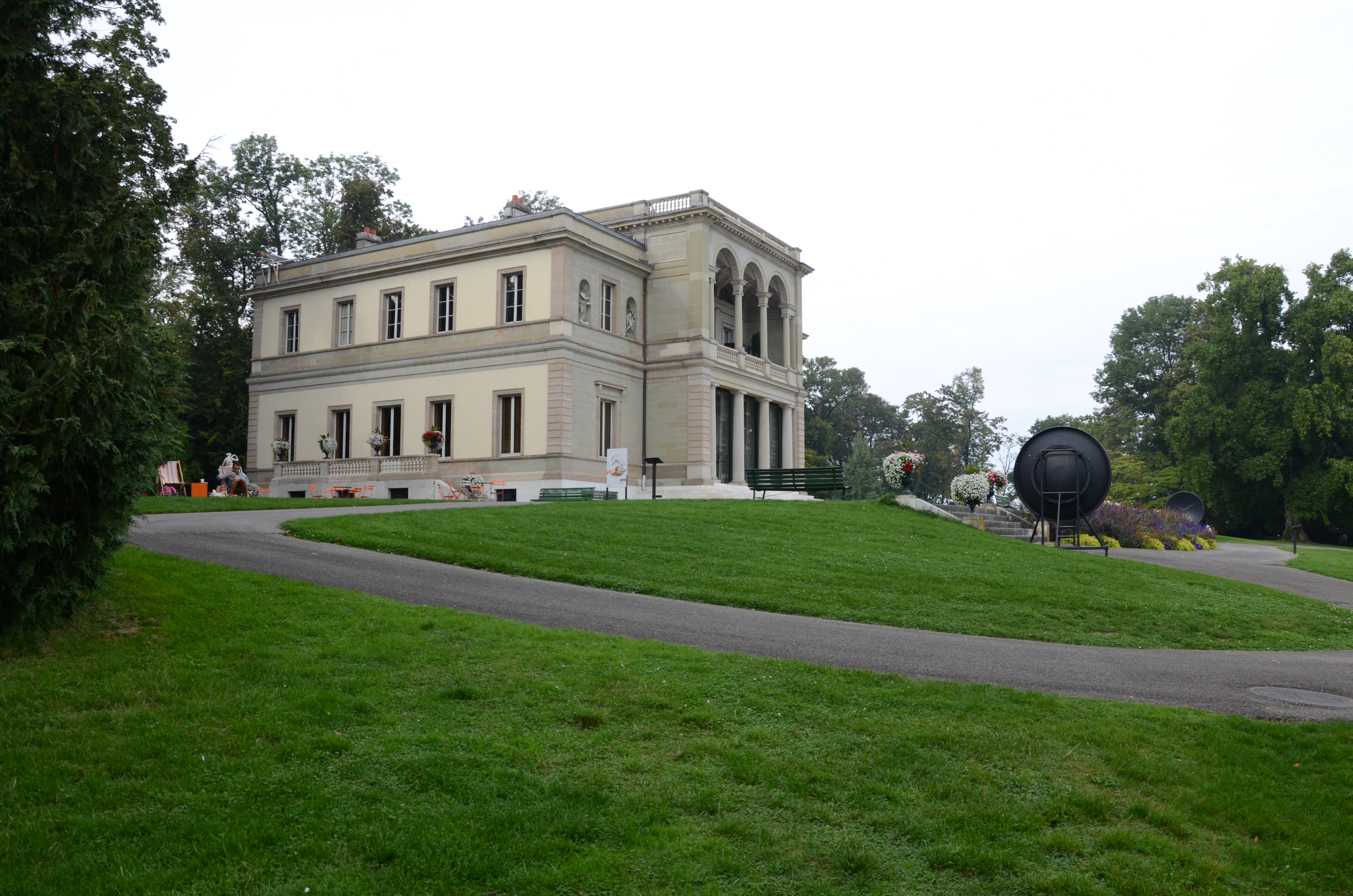
- Villa Bartholoni
- Established: 1964
- Coordinates: 46.220587°N 6.152408°E
- Visitors: 250,000
- Founder: l'Association du Musée et de la Revue d'histoire des sciences
- Director: Jacques Ayer
- Website: www.ville-ge.ch/mhs/

The Musée d'histoire des sciences de la Ville de Genève (Museum of the History of Science of the City of Geneva) is a small museum in Switzerland dedicated to the history of science.

== Location ==
The museum is located in the Villa Bartholoni, designed by Félix-Emmanuel Callet, built in 1830 as a summer residence for Parisian bankers, Constant and Jean-François Bartholoni and extensively restored between 1985 and 1992. It is situated in the park La Perle du Lac, overlooking Lake Geneva, adjacent to the Geneva Botanical Garden. Both the Villa and the museum itself are listed in the Swiss Inventory of Cultural Property of National and Regional Significance.

== Access ==
The Museum is open daily from 10am to 5pm, except for 25 December and 1 January and admission is free. The museum receives over 250,000 visitors per year.

== History ==
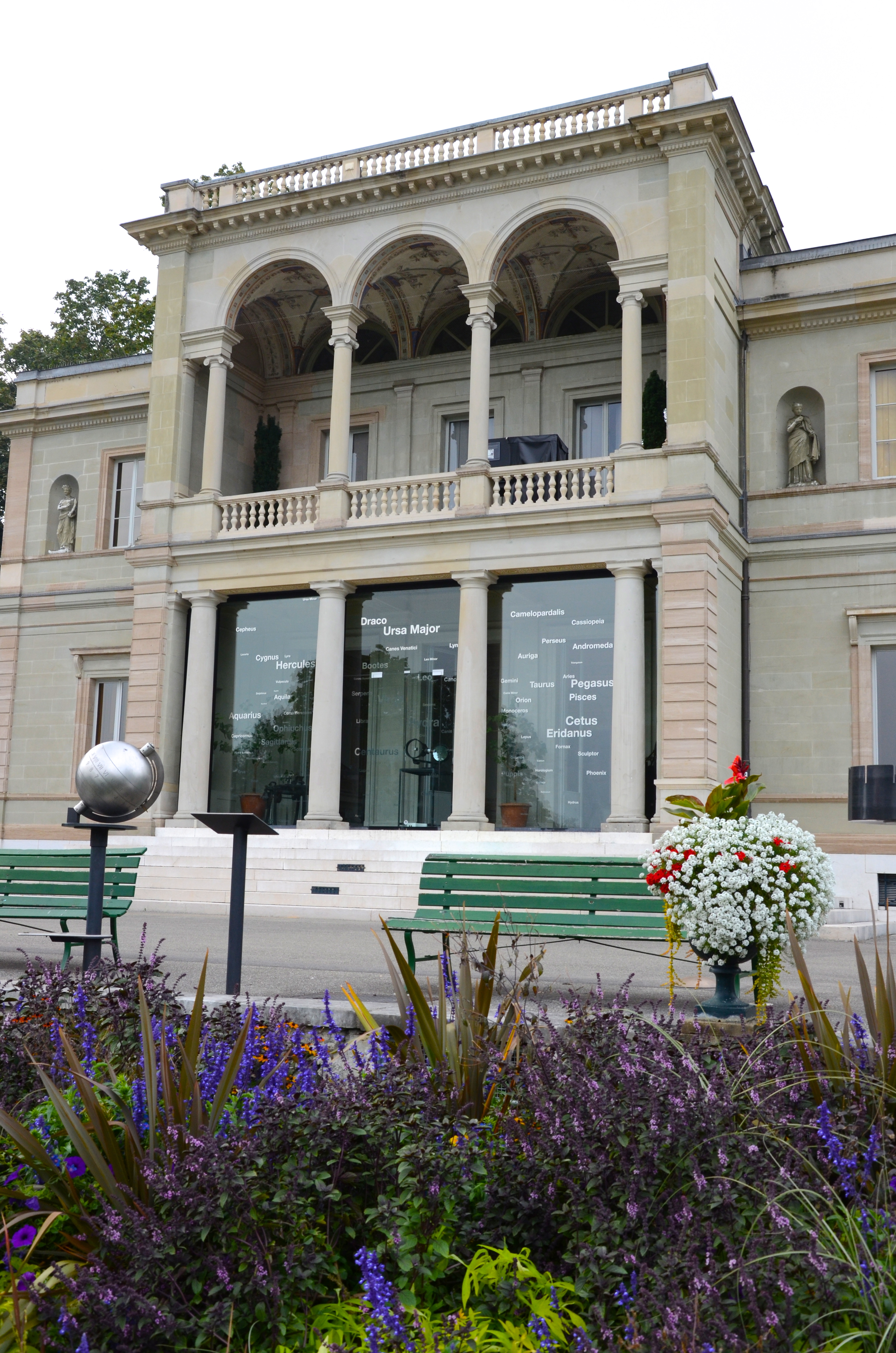
Musée d'histoire des sciences

The museum was established in 1964 by the enthusiasm of l'Association du Musée et de la Revue d'histoire des sciences (the Museum and review of the History of Science Association), following an exhibition of science history at the Musée Rath. Once opened the Swiss Institute of Physics and Observatory donated their historic instruments to the collection. Early director, the astronomer Margarida Archinard, was succeeded by chemist, Marc Cramer. Jacques Ayer has been director since 2012.

Initially affiliated to the Musée d'Art et d'Histoire, since 2006 the museum has been linked to the Natural History Museum of Geneva.

== Collections and exhibits ==
The collections primarily comprise scientific measurement apparatus from the 17th-19th centuries including microscopes, telescopes, thermometers, etc., principally the former equipment of Genevan scientists including Saussure, Pictet, de la Rive and Colladon. Displays include practical experiments within the building and some exhibits in the surrounding park.

Exhibits on display
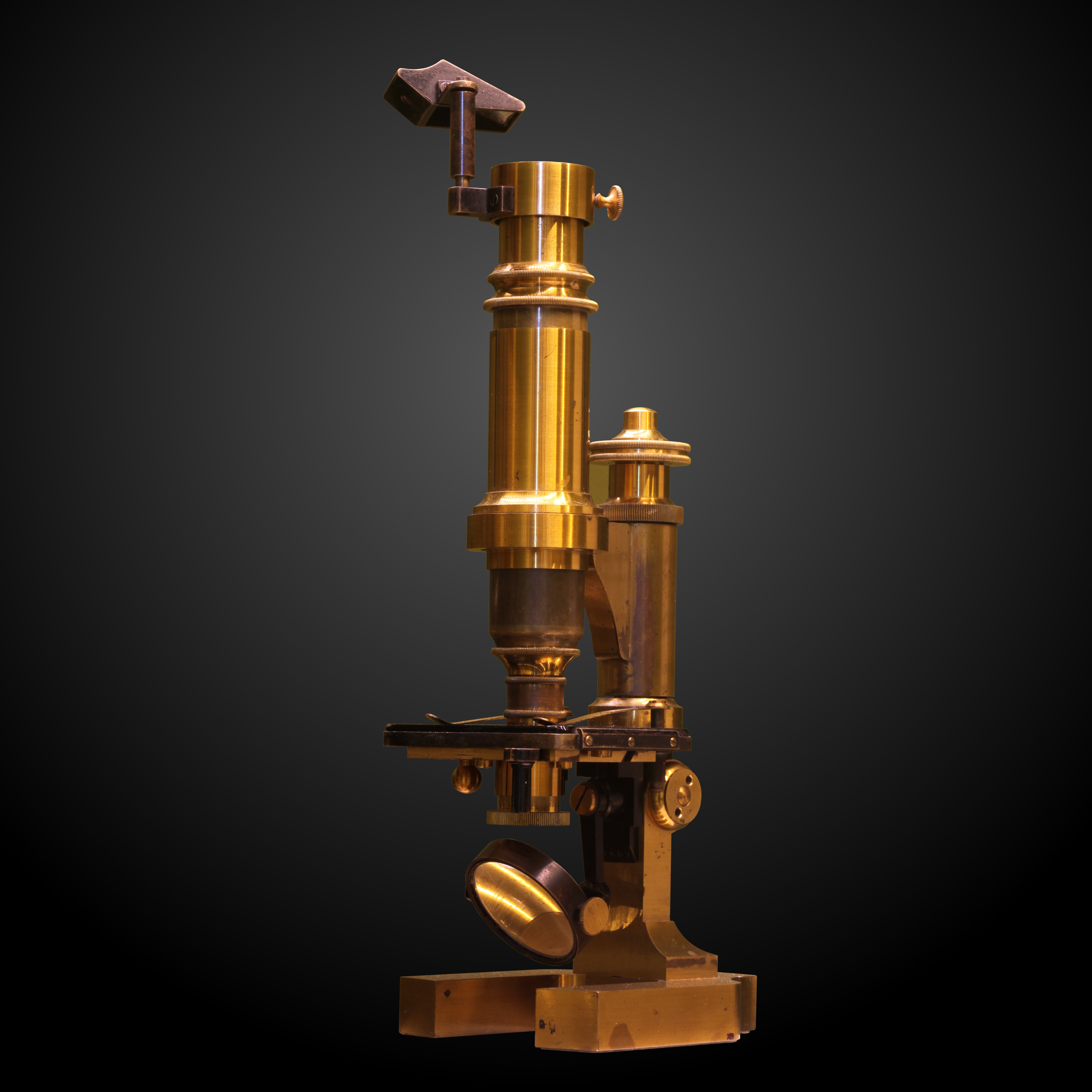
19th-century microscope incorporating a camera lucida, made by Constant Verick, Paris

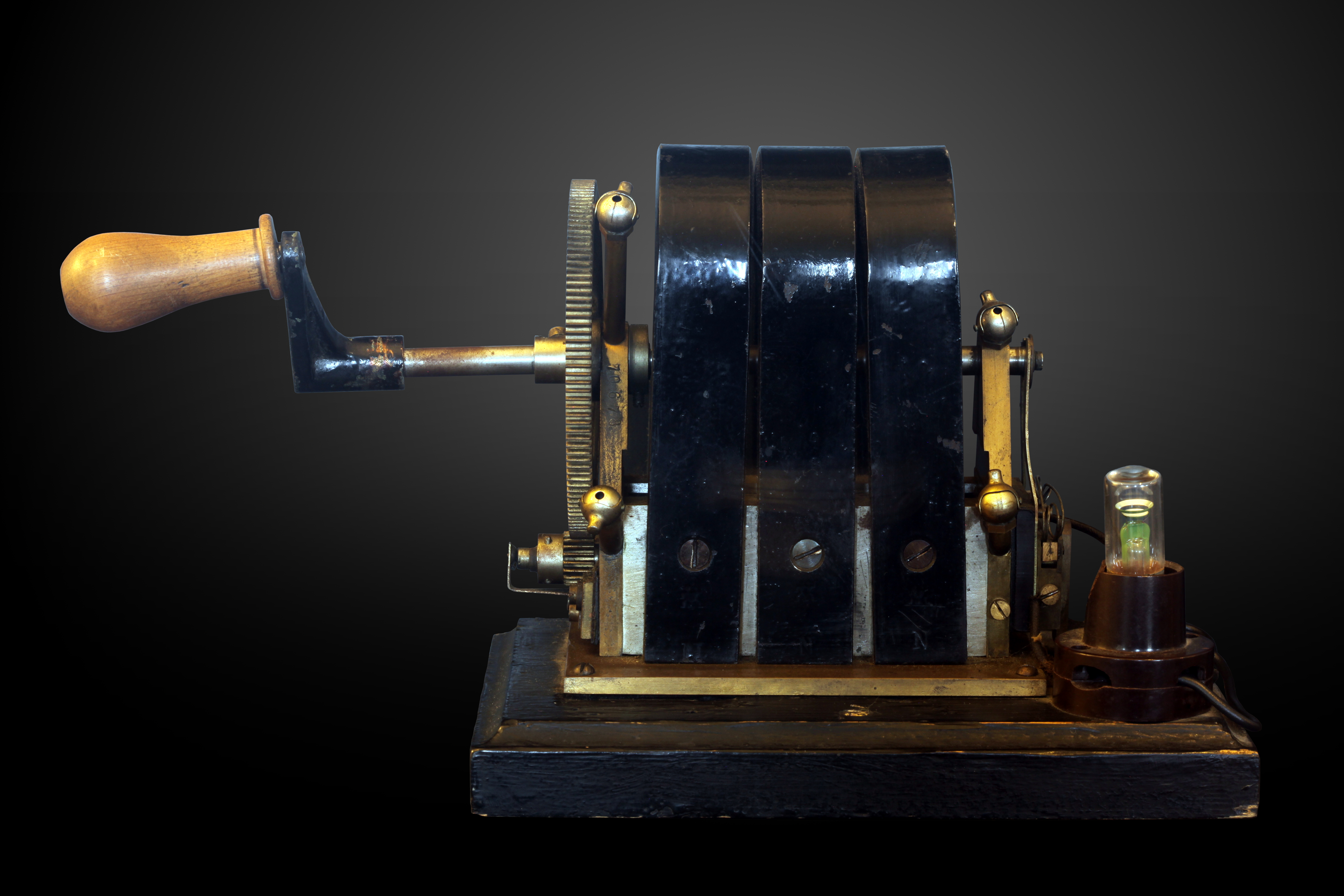
Magneto-electric machine made circa 1925

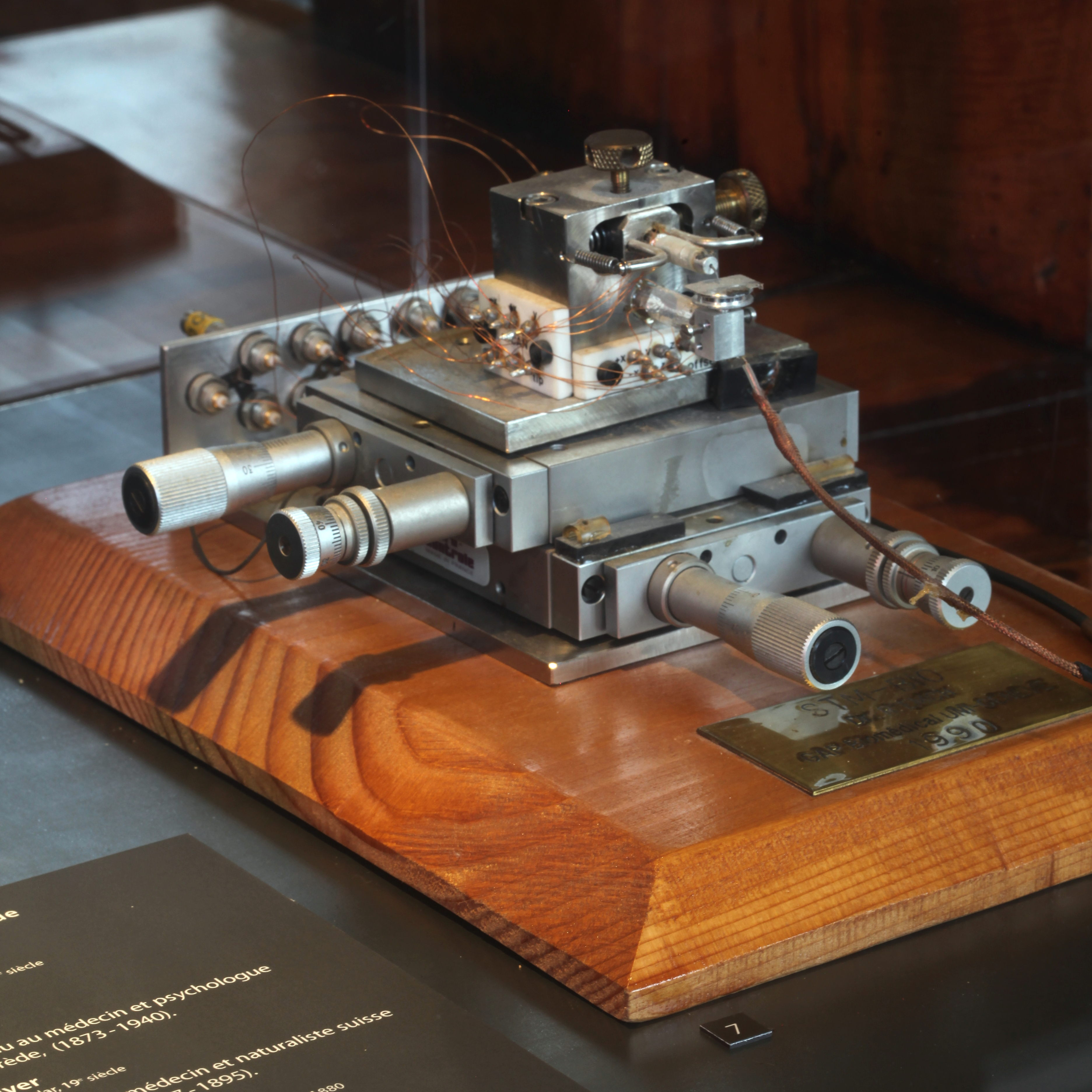
Scanning tunneling microscope made by Emch and used at Geneva University between 1986 and 1990

== See also ==
- List of museums in Switzerland
