= Abigail Larson =

American illustrator

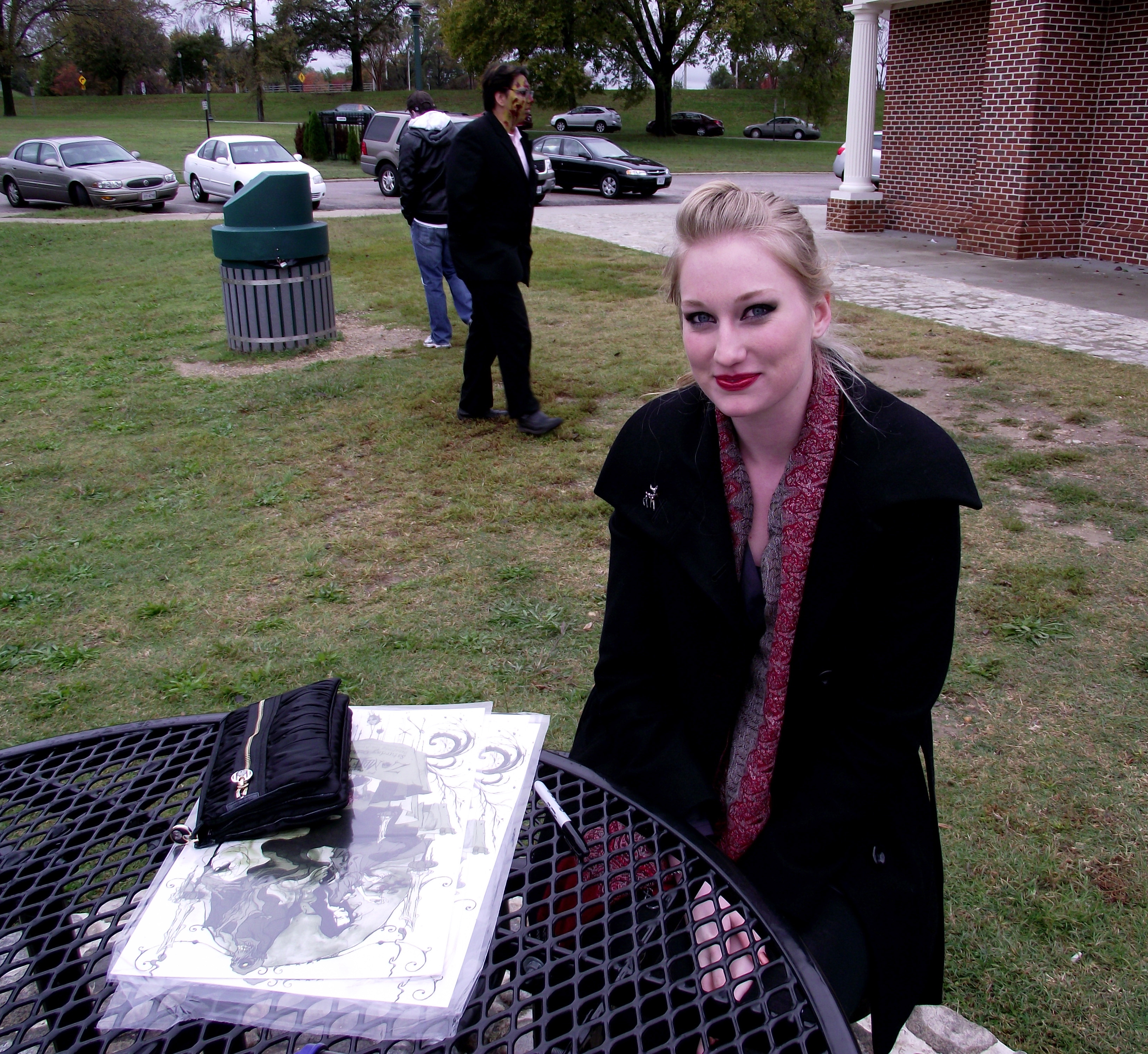
- Abigail Larson at ZombieWalk 2011 in Richmond, Virginia
- Born: Virginia, US
- Education: Virginia Commonwealth University
- Known for: Illustration, mixed media

Abigail Larson is an American illustrator. She creates mixed media original artwork in the dark fantasy genre, drawing on themes from Gothic and horror literature. Her illustrations often feature Victorian fashion and fantasy or horror elements such as ghosts. She uses a combination of traditional sketching and digital coloring to complete her illustrations.

Larson works primarily as a freelance artist. Her credits include coloring books, tarot decks, comic books, and television shows. She has illustrated for several major publishing and production companies, including DC, Dark Horse Comics, Netflix Animation, and Disney Books. She has also served as a character designer on several projects. She won the Hugo Award for Best Professional Artist in 2016.

== Early life and education ==
Larson was born and raised in Virginia. Her father is an archaeologist and her mother is a cultural anthropologist. At one point in her childhood, her mother worked as a seamstress — this inspired one of Larson's first drawings, a self-portrait of her future self in a wedding dress. As a child, she dreamed of becoming an opera singer, but suffered from severe stage fright; she also dreamed of joining the circus. Larson's family has been supportive of her career as an artist.

Larson attended Virginia Commonwealth University, graduating in 2010 with a Bachelor of Fine Arts in Communication Arts. Her concentration was Drawing and Illustration. She credits her high school art teacher with being an early supporter of her work and encouraging her to apply to art school.

== Career ==
=== Character design ===
Larson was the character designer for The Huntsman: Winter's Curse, a video game created in 2016 by Universal Pictures and Desert Owl Games as a companion to the film Snow White & the Huntsman. While the game itself received poor reviews, the art was praised by reviewers. Larson has contributed artwork to several games by Choice of Games. She has also designed a loading screen for Fortnite. Beginning in 2020, Larson was a character designer on the Netflix Animation original series Blue Eye Samurai. She worked full-time on the series, and was particularly involved in designing the show's costumes.

=== Comic books ===
Abigail Larson's cover art for Evanescence: Tales from the Void#1.

As a freelancer, Larson has accumulated 20 comic book art credits from companies including DC, Dark Horse, Image, and Titan. Many of these credits are for single issues of longer runs. In 2020, Larson did the covers for the mini-series Lady Baltimore: The Witch Queens, written by Mike Mignola and Daniel Golden with artwork by Bridgit Connell. In 2021, Larson worked on the first issue of rock band Evanescence's graphic anthology series Echoes from the Void. The series featured stories inspired by the band's music. Larson contributed both cover art and interior illustrations. Her cover for issue #1 was later turned into an NFT as part of a project by the band. In 2023, Larson returned to do the cover art for the one-shot sequel to the mini-series The Witch Queens, Lady Baltimore: The Dream of Ikelos.

=== Other projects ===
Other projects that Larson has worked on include book cover art, tarot decks, coloring books, sticker books, illustrated re-publications of classic stories, children's literature, and tabletop RPGs. Larson is an Official Fluevog Creator, as the advertisement she designed for their "The Queen of Prussia Ludovika" shoe won their FleuvogCreative contest in 2014. The advertisement ran in print in Vice and Bust. In 2021, Larson published Crimson, a 248-page art book containing a selection of her pieces spanning a decade. The project was funded through Kickstarter.

Between 2010 and 2015, Larson contributed artwork to multiple events at The Poe Museum in Richmond, Virginia. At a 2014 Halloween event, her illustrations were used on a wine bottle label for the Vincent Price Signature Wine Collection and the can for a local craft brewery's red ale. She also illustrated posters for Richmond's annual Zombie Walk.

== Personal life ==
Larson lives in Turin, Italy, with her husband. She works primarily out of her home studio there.

== Artistry ==
=== Style and technique ===
Larson is known for her Gothic style. She often works within the dark fantasy genre; her illustrations contain macabre themes and are heavily influenced by horror movies and literature, sometimes depicting creatures such as vampires and ghosts. She frequently centers women and femininity in her illustrations, and has emphasized the importance of storytelling in her process and finished pieces. Larson often exaggerates perspective and proportions in her work. She describes movement as important to illustration, and therefore favors dynamic poses.

Larson works in mixed media — she does her initial sketches, line work, and coloring on paper, and finishes her coloring digitally. She completes initial sketches on Canson paper with mechanical pencil, then transfers her final sketch onto watercolor paper. She then inks the drawing and does a watercolor wash, which adds depth and texture to the final piece. Finally, she scans the drawing and does the final colors in Photoshop. Larson has stated that although she has tried digital drawing, drawing on paper "feels better" to her, and she likes the way ink on paper looks.

=== Influences and inspiration ===
Larson has cited several artists as influences on her work, including Golden Age illustrators such as Arthur Rackham and Kay Nielsen. She has also named filmmakers Tim Burton, Hayao Miyazaki, Guillermo del Toro, and Tony DiTerlizzi as influences.

Larson describes "fairytales, folklore and ghost stories" as her "greatest inspirations". Ghosts sometimes appear in her work, as do other fantasy and horror creatures. Some of the inspirations that she has discussed include the work of Edgar Allan Poe and H. P. Lovecraft; Bram Stoker's Dracula and Mary Shelley's Frankenstein; novelists Charlotte Brontë and Shirley Jackson; and classic fairy tales such as those by the Brothers Grimm. She also draws inspiration from Victorian aesthetics, often depicting Victorian fashion and other period clothing in her illustrations.

== Honors and awards ==
In 2016, Larson won the Hugo Award for Best Professional Artist. Also in 2016, she received an honorable mention in the Society of Illustrators of Los Angeles's 55th annual Illustration West competition for her Penny Dreadful #1 variant cover.

In 2022, her art book Crimson was a finalist in the Prix Imaginales Illustration category.

== Publications and credits ==
=== Book covers ===
- Gothic Blue Book IV: The Folklore Edition (short story anthology, Burial Day Books, 2014, ISBN 9780984730445)
- Loteria by Cynthia Pelayo (first edition, CreateSpace, 2012, ISBN 1477695621)
- Titan Magic: Body and Soul by Jodi Lamm (2013, CreateSpace, ISBN 9781494336691)
- Literary Noir: A Series of Suspense Vols. 1–3 (collection of Cornell Woolrich stories, published by his estate and Renaissance Literary & Talent, 2018)
- VANITY: The True Story Behind The Scarlet Countess Elizabeth Bathory by Jurii Kirnev (first edition, Chaos Imperium Press, 2017)
- Sam the Spectator Book 1: The Haunter by Kendra Alvey (2018)
- Sam the Spectator Book 2: Ghostapalooza by Kendra Alvey (2019)
- Sam the Spectator Book 3: The Ghosts of Summers Past by Kendra Alvey (2020)
- Weird Tales #363 (2019)
- Gothic Blue Book VI: A Krampus Carol (short story anthology, Burial Day Books, 2020)
- Santa Muerte and The Missing by Cynthia Pelayo (original cover art for each book, published by Post Mortem Press in 2012 and 2016 respectively; and the cover art for the 2021 combined reprint published by Thunderstorm Books)
- Rear Window and Other Murderous Tales (collection of Cornell Woolrich stories, published by his estate and Renaissance Literary & Talent, 2022)
- The Wilderwood Duology by Hannah Whitten (Hachette Book Group, 2024)

=== Comic book art credits ===
- Sandman Universe: The Dreaming #5, #7, #8 (DC/Vertigo, 2019)
- Teen Titans Go! to Camp! #6 (DC, 2020)
- Evanescence: Echoes from the Void #1 (Incendium/Opus, 2021)
- Deadman Tells the Spooky Tales: "The Cemetery" (DC, 2022)
- Cradle of Filth: Maledictus Athenaeum #3 (Incendium/Opus, 2022)
- CREEPSHOW Vol. 2 #2 (Image Comics, 2023)

=== Comic book cover art credits ===
- Edward Scissorhands #9 (IDW, 2015)
- Penny Dreadful #1 (2nd print, Titan Comics, 2016)
- Assassin's Creed #14 (Variant C, Titan Comics, 2016)
- Assassin's Creed: Templars #9 (Titan Comics, 2017)
- Penny Dreadful #8 (Titan Comics, 2018)
- The Magic Order #5 (variant C, Netflix/Image Comics, 2018)
- Lady Baltimore #1–5 (Dark Horse, 2021)
- A Man Among Ye #5 (variant B, Image Comics, 2021)
- Doctor Who: Missy #3 (Titan/BBC, 2021)
- Evanescence: Echoes from the Void #1 (Incendium/Opus, 2021)
- Buffy the Last Vampire Slayer #1 (variant, BOOM! Studios, 2022)
- GRIM #1 (variant, BOOM! Studios, 2022)

=== Gallery shows ===
- Creature Features: October Shadows, 2012
- Viktor Wynd Fine Art (Last Tuesday Society): The Party Show, 2012
- Gallery Nucleus: Power in Numbers 5, 2020
- Gallery Nucleus: Playbills: A Broadway Poster Show, February–March 2020
- Gallery Nucleus: Phantasy Arcade 2: Insert Coin, December 2021 – January 2022
- Gallery Nucleus: Disney Dream Destinations 4, December 2022 – January 2023
- Gallery Nucleus: Let's Do This One More Time: Across the Spider-Verse Exhibition & Panel, August 2023
- Gallery Nucleus: The Last of Us 10-Year Anniversary, September–October 2023
- Illustration West 56

=== Illustrated books/interior art ===
- Sarah Faire and the House at the End of the World by Alex Gianni (2013)
- Monster Goose Nursery Rhymes by Henry Herz, Josh Herz, Harrison Herz (Pelican Publishing House, 2014, ISBN 9781455620326)."
- The Spirit of Krampus by Kate Danley (2014)
- When You Give An Imp A Penny by Henry Herz (Pelican Publishing House, 2016, ISBN 9781455621446).
- Abigail Larson's The Cats of Ulthar (illustrated edition of H.P. Lovecraft short story of same name, One Peace Books, 2016)
- The Sisters Grimm by Menna van Praag (Harper Voyager, 2020, ISBN 9780062932464)
- Crimson (artbook by Abigail Larson, Caurette Editions, 2021, ISBN 978-2-38289-002-8)
- Mexican Gothic by Silvia Moreno-Garcia (limited edition, Subterranean Press, 2022)
- Disney Cautionary Tales by Ridley Pearson (Disney Press, 2022, ISBN 9781368062282)
- Sketch.Box: Abigail Larson (sketchbook by Abigail Larson, Caurette Editions, 2023, ISBN 978-2-38289-088-2)

=== Other media ===
- Dark Wood Tarot (Sasha Graham, Llewellyn Publishing, 2020, ISBN 9780738759302)
- The Nightmare Before Christmas Tarot Deck and Guidebook (Minerva Siegel, Insight Editions, 2020, ISBN 9781683839699)
- Horror Tarot Deck and Guidebook (Aria Gmitter & Minerva Siegel, Insight Editions, 2022, ISBN 9781647225469)
- Court of the Dead: Dark Harvest (card game, Skybound Games/Sideshow Collectibles, 2019)
- Alice's Wonderfilled Adventures (colouring book, Impact/Penguin, 2016, ISBN 9781440346682)
- Disney Art of Coloring: A Twisted Tale (colouring book, Disney Books, 2023, ISBN 9781368099271)
- Sticker Jigsaw: The Edgar Allan Poe Collection (Odd Dot, Macmillan Publishers, 2024, ISBN 9781250908346)
