= F.I.L.A. (company) =

Italian art supplies company

F.I.L.A. – Fabbrica Italiana Lapis ed Affini S.p.A
- Trade name: F.I.L.A. Group
- Company type: Public
- Traded as: BIT: FILA; FTSE Italia Small Cap
- Industry: Art materials
- Founded: 1920; 106 years ago in Florence
- Headquarters: Milan, Italy
- Area served: Worldwide
- Number of employees: 3,263
- Subsidiaries: Canson; Daler-Rowney; Dixon Ticonderoga
- Website: fila-group.it

F.I.L.A. – Fabbrica Italiana Lapis ed Affini S.p.A., doing business as F.I.L.A. Group, is an Italian multinational supplier of art materials and related products, with subsidiaries and brands such as Daler-Rowney, Canson, Lyra and Maimeri.

F.I.L.A. was founded in 1920 in Florence, Italy, and since 1959 the head office is in Milan. The growth has included several company acquisitions.

In 1964 Alberto Candela succeeds his father Renato. Under his direction, new products such as Giotto Fibra and the Tiziano line were born. In 1973 the "writing pen" was launched on the market under the name Tratto-Pen. This new model receives the 1979 Compasso d'Oro award and is later exhibited at the MoMA in New York.

In 1992 Massimo Candela, Alberto's son, took over from his father and became CEO. Since 1994 F.I.L.A. a policy of acquisitions begins, including Adica Pongo, a historic company in the modeling pastes sector; Compania de Lapices y Afines Ltda, Papeleria Mediterranea SL., Giotto be-bè, the American Dixon Ticonderoga, one of the historic pencil companies also present in Canada, China and Mexico; the French Canson (founded in 1557 by the Montgolfier family), Lyra, Lapicera Mexicana; Lycin and a minority share of the Indian Writefine Products Private Limited (2011).

The company was listed on the Milan stock exchange in November 2015.

According to figures presented by F.I.L.A. Group, it was present in around 50 countries, with a total of 6,500 employees in 2016.

== List of Fabbrica Italiana Lapis ed Affini acquisitions ==
- 2005 – Dixon Ticonderoga
- 2008 – Lyra
- 2016 February – Daler Rowney
- 2016 September – St Cuthberts Mill
- 2016 October – Canson
- 2018 May – Pacon
- 2019 October – Arches paper

== Brands ==
- Blanca Nieves
- Canson
- Daler-Rowney
- DAS
- Didò
- Dixon Ticonderoga
  - Dixon
  - Ticonderoga
  - Lyra
- DOMS
- Giotto
- Giotto be-bè
- Lukas
- Maimeri
- Mapita
- Mercurio
- Metrico
- Pax
- Pongo
- Pacon
- Prang
- Tratto
- Uti Guti
- Vinci
- Vividel
