= Ruwe Pencil =

The Ruwe Pencil Company was an American manufacturer of woodcased pencils and drawing leads. Based in Greenwich, Connecticut, they were purchased by Dixon Ticonderoga in 1988.

== Gallery ==
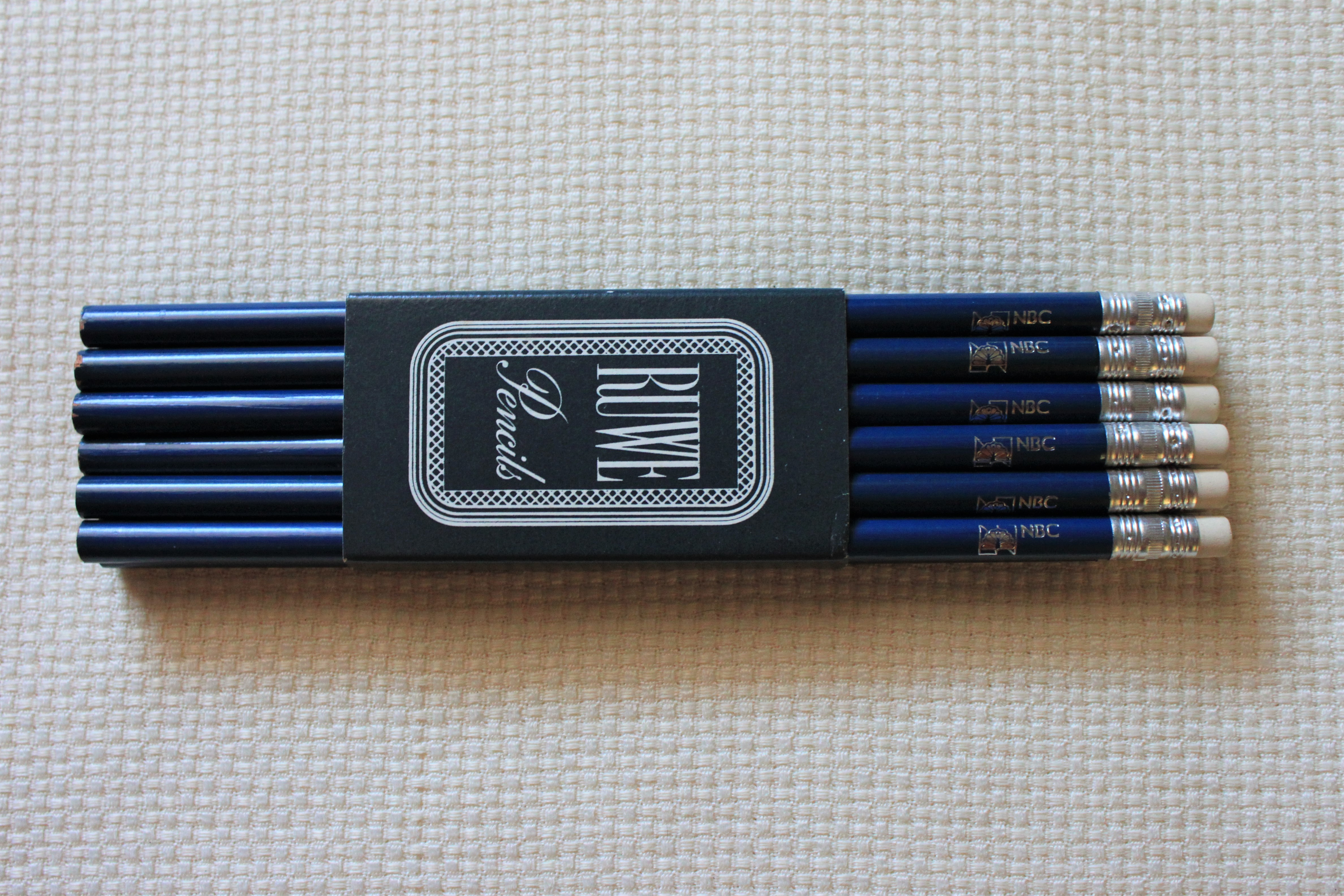
Ruwe pencils No. 2

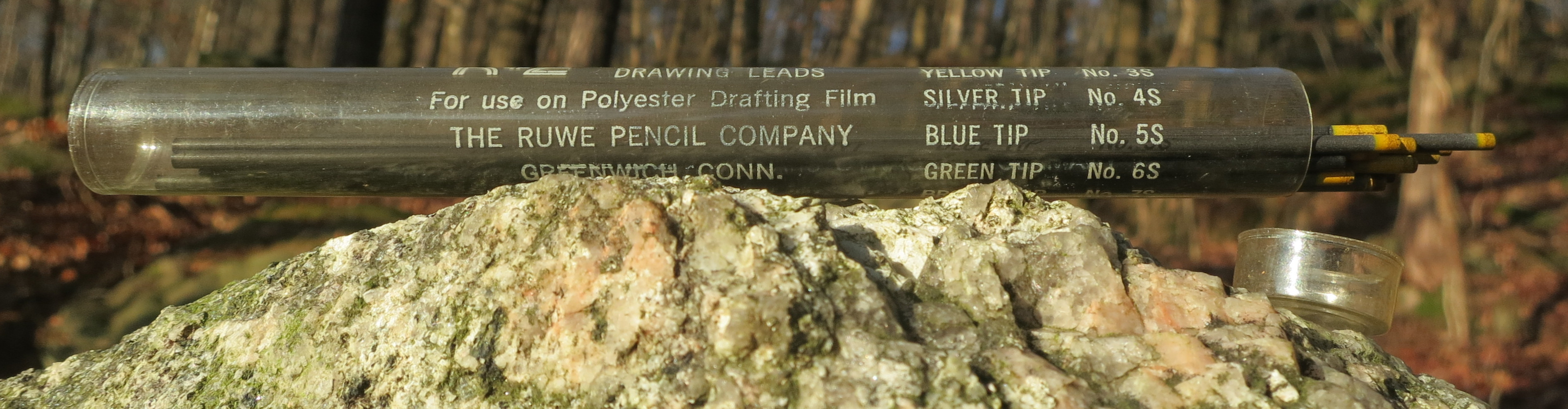
Polyester drafting film drawing leads by Ruwe
