= Skarvelis =

Skarvelis or Scarvelis (Greek: Σκαρβέλης) is a Greek surname and may refer to any of the following people:

- Agamemnon Skarvelis (Greek: Αγαμέμνων Σκαρβέλης; died 1862 Kythnos, Greece), Greek student who took part in and was executed during the Antiochonian revolution in Kythnos, Greece
- Dimitrios Skarvelis (Greek: Δημήτριος Σκαρβέλης; born 1933 Chios, Greece), Greek General: Chief of the General Staff of the Hellenic Army (ΓΕΣ) of the Greek Army (1990–1993), Chief of the General Staff of the National Defense of Greece (ΓΕΕΘΑ) of the Hellenic Armed Forces (1993), Greek soldier and ex officio member of the Academy of Athens
- Kostas Skarvelis (Greek: Κώστας Σκαρβέλης; 1880 Constantinople–1942 Athens, Greece), Greek composer of the rembetiko (ρεμπέτικο) genre, lyricist and musician
- Kostas "Gus" Stephanos Scarvelis (Greek: Κώστας Σκαρβέλης; birth Chios, Greece - USA) Greek-born American engineer, inventor creating many patents for Georgia Pacific Corrugated LLC and OI Glass while working for Owens Illinois in Toledo, Ohio such as the "Process for making wet-strength paper and product thereof" and "Method of extruding a foamed plastic composition" and working for the Continental Can Company such as "Pouch manufacturing means and method" for "certain food products, notably sliced cheeses and sliced meats" in Mount Vernon, Ohio
- Kristi Scarvelis (Greek: Κρίστη Σκαρβέλη;), American-born Greek singer and musician of the New York music group Auramics, filmmaker and designer
- Nicholas Scarvelis (Greek: Νικόλαος Σκαρβέλης; born 1993), American-born Greek athlete
- Nikolaos G. Skarvelis (Greek: Νικόλαος Σκαρβέλης; 1801 Chios, Greece-1858, Greece), Greek Commander of the Athens Infantry in the 3 September 1843 Revolution, fighter in the Greek Revolution of 1821
- Spyridon Skarvelis (Greek: Σπυρίδων Σκαρβέλης; 1868 Corfu, Greece–1942 Corfu, Greece), Greek painter of the Ioanian School
- Stamatia Scarvelis (Greek: Σταματία Σκαρβέλη; born 1995), American-born Greek athlete
