= L.S.D.F. Number 50 =

1979 painting by Yvonne Pickering Carter

L.S.D.F. #50
- Artist: Yvonne Pickering Carter
- Year: 1979
- Medium: Watercolor on folded Arches paper in Plexiglas
- Location: North Carolina Museum of Art, Raleigh, North Carolina

L.S.D.F. #50 is a 1979 painting by Yvonne Pickering Carter. It is in the collection of the North Carolina Museum of Art in Raleigh, North Carolina in the United States.

The painting comprises three torn pieces of Arches paper with abstract, minimalistic, watercolor paintings on them. The pieces of paper are attached roughly to a piece of Plexiglas. It signed and dated by Carter on the lower left of the piece.

L.S.D.F. #50 was purchased by the North Carolina Museum of Art in 1979 with funding from the National Endowment for the Arts and the North Carolina State Art Society.
