= Diminutive Folded Linear Series Number 4 =

1978 painting by Yvonne Pickering Carter

Diminutive Folded Linear Series #4
- Artist: Yvonne Pickering Carter
- Year: 1978
- Medium: Watercolor on folded paper in plexiglas
- Location: Gibbes Museum of Art, Charleston, South Carolina

Diminutive Folded Linear Series #4 is a 1978 painting by Yvonne Pickering Carter. It is in the collection of the Gibbes Museum of Art in Charleston, South Carolina in the United States.

The painting comprises a collection of pieces of paper, folded and sewed together, painted with colorful, abstract watercolor paintings. Carter's signature is located on the bottom right of the painting, reading: Yvonne Pickering Carter '78. The painting is attached to a piece of plexiglas. The painting is part of Carter's Diminutive Folded Linear Series.

Diminutive Folded Linear Series #4 was purchased by the Gibbes Museum of Art in 1978 with funding from the National Endowment for the Arts.
