= Daler-Rowney =

English art materials manufacturer

Daler-Rowney Ltd
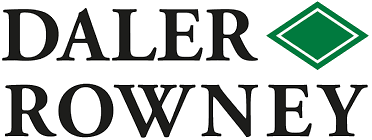
- Formerly: T. & R. Rowney
- Type: Limited
- Industry: Art materials
- Founded: 1783; 243 years ago
- Founder: George Rowney & Daler Family
- Headquarters: Bracknell, United Kingdom
- Area served: Worldwide
- Key people: Dominique Paradis (CEO)
- Products: Acrylic, oil, watercolor, brushes, charcoal, pastel, color pencils, papers
- Parent: F.I.L.A.
- Website: daler-rowney.com

Daler-Rowney Ltd is an English art materials manufacturer based in Bracknell. The company, a subsidiary of conglomerate F.I.L.A. Group, manufactures and commercialises a wide range of artist products such as Acrylic, oil, watercolor, brushes, charcoal, pastel, color pencils, and papers.

== History ==
=== George Rowney & Co. Ltd. ===
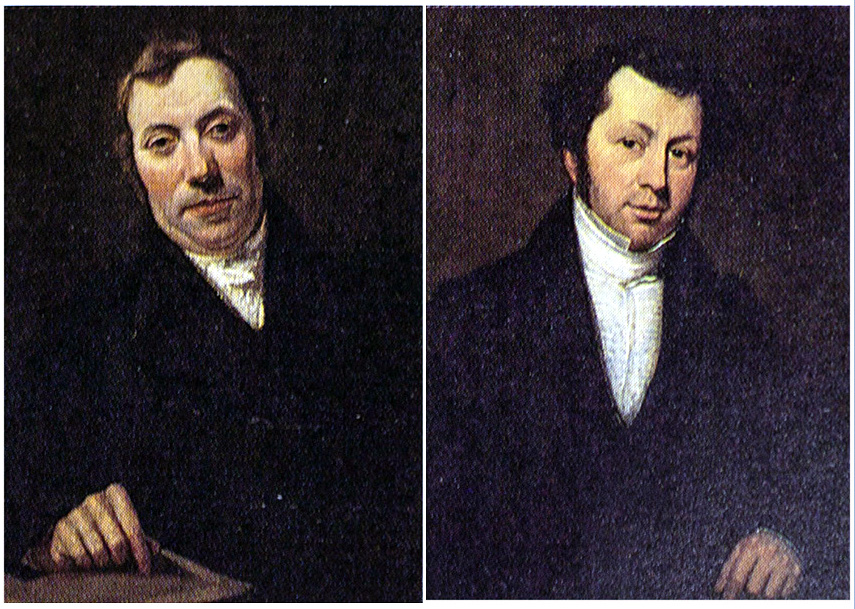
The Rowney Brothers

The business was established as "T. & R. Rowney" in 1783 by the two brothers Thomas and Richard Rowney as a perfume maker and wig supplier with a shop on Holborn Hill in London, and soon moved into supplying writing materials and then artists' materials. The brothers then went out of partnership, with Richard concentrating on the perfume and wig business, and Thomas on the artists' supplies.

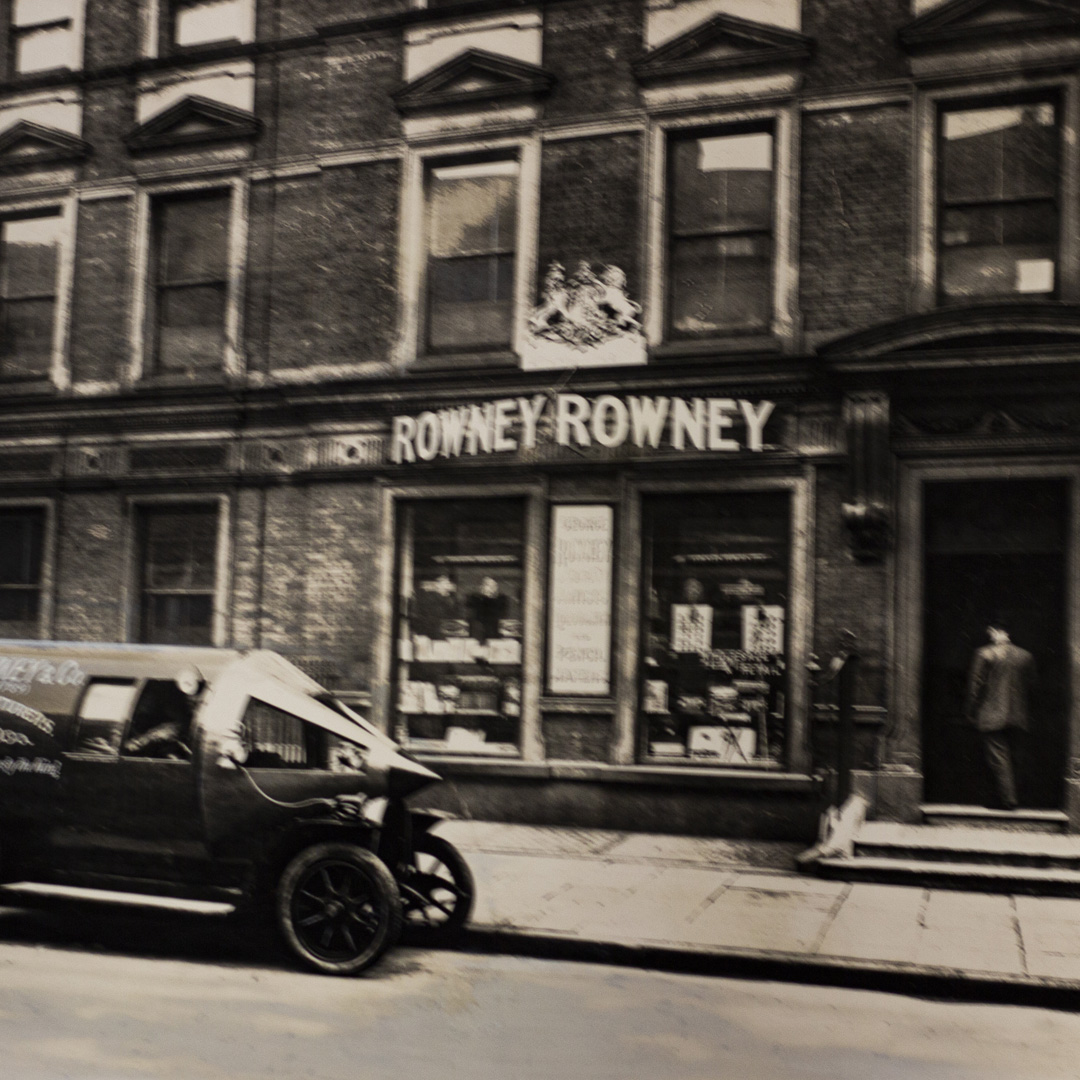
Rowney Shop in London

In 1806, Thomas's son, Richard, started an apprenticeship in the business and on its completion set up in partnership with his brother-in law, Richard Forster, as "Rowney & Forster", and began supplying famous artists including Constable and Turner.

Forster retired about 1832, and in 1837, the company became known as "George Rowney & Company" when Thomas’s son, "George Rowney", took over the firm. One of the company's successful products was the Birchmore Board, used widely at the turn of the century 1900. In 1924, the business was incorporated as a limited company, "George Rowney & Co Ltd". The company was merged with the Daler Board Company in 1983 to form Daler-Rowney Ltd. Current CEO is Patrick Giraud.

=== Daler Board Company ===
The Daler Board Company was established in 1946 by the Daler family. Between 1945 and 1960, Daler developed a variety of products such as pads (including the Red and Yellow Series A that is still part of the range), canvas panels, stretched canvases, mountboards and artists' luggage.

In 1988, the company established distribution offices in Cranbury, New Jersey, United States and in 1994 "Robert Simmons" brand of artists' brushes was bought. In 2006, Daler-Rowney acquired the US brand Cachet, a hardback book publishing line.

In February 2016, Daler-Rowney was acquired by the Milan-based F.I.L.A. Group.

== Headquarters and manufacturers ==
The Daler-Rowney Head Office is located in Bracknell, Berkshire, in the south east of England. The company moved from central London to its present address and headquarters in Bracknell in 1969. The process of manufacturing is divided into two different sites: the colours and paper products are produced at the headquarters in Bracknell; the brushes are manufactured in La Romana, Dominican Republic.

On Monday 25th May 2026 a major fire broke out at Daler-Rowney's Bracknell headquarters, with the local area evacuated by emergency services.
