= St Cuthberts Mill =

British paper company

Coordinates: 51.216476°N 2.673498°W

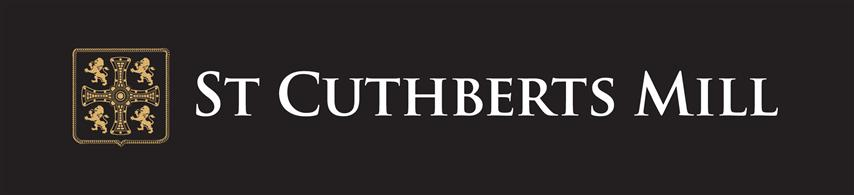
- Company type: Limited
- Industry: Paper
- Founded: 1736
- Headquarters: Wells, Somerset, United Kingdom
- Area served: Worldwide
- Products: Artist papers. Watercolour, mixed media, printmaking, and fine art inkjet papers
- Parent: F.I.L.A. Group (Fabbrica Italiana Lapis ed Affini)
- Website: www.stcuthbertsmill.com

St Cuthberts Mill is a British paper manufacturing company in Wells, Somerset, that specialises in mould made artists papers. The range includes traditional painting and printmaking papers, and inkjet papers.

== History ==
Production of paper on the St Cuthberts Mill site began in 1736, producing hand made paper under the name Lower Wookey Mill. Lower Wookey Mill was leased by Joseph Coles (aka Joseph Coles Sprague) in 1786. The Coles family were active in the Axe Valley for around a century. Joseph Coles first recorded his watermarks in 1797/9.

A Hollander beater ‘beating machine’ was installed to increase production.

In 1856 Edward Burgess and Ward bought the mill and installed two Fourdrinier machines, which were powered by a new water wheel designed by Henry Coles of Henley Mill.

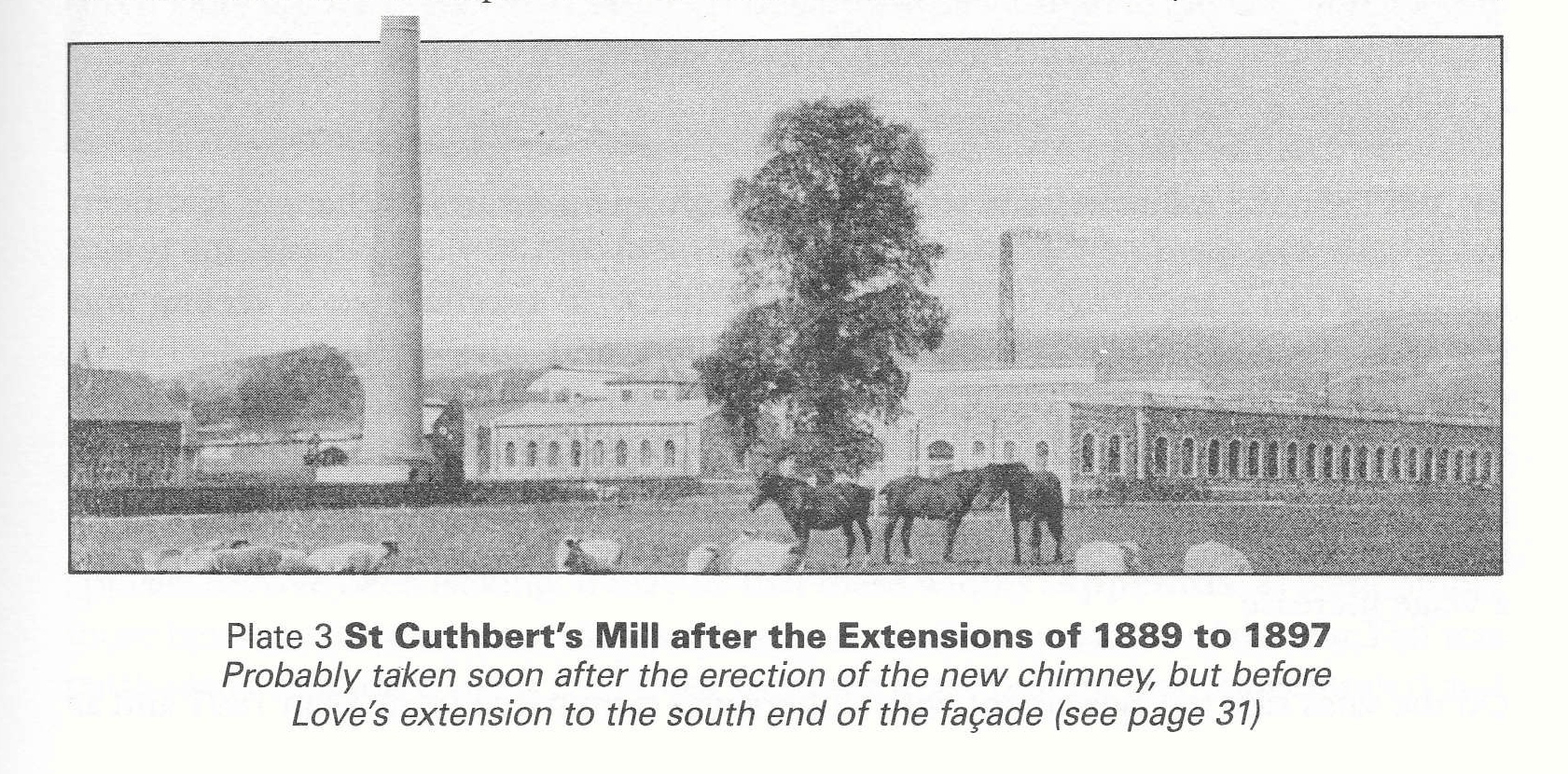
St Cuthberts Mill Paperworks, circa 1889 -1897. (MIll 364)

1876. A new partnership resulted in the mill increasing its production. The Mill had esparto and rag preparation capabilities, dusters, nine boilers for grass and rags, four potchers, fifteen beaters, chemical processing plant, gas works, two machines, mechanics shop, and offices on site. All of this was powered by a water wheel and eleven steam engines.

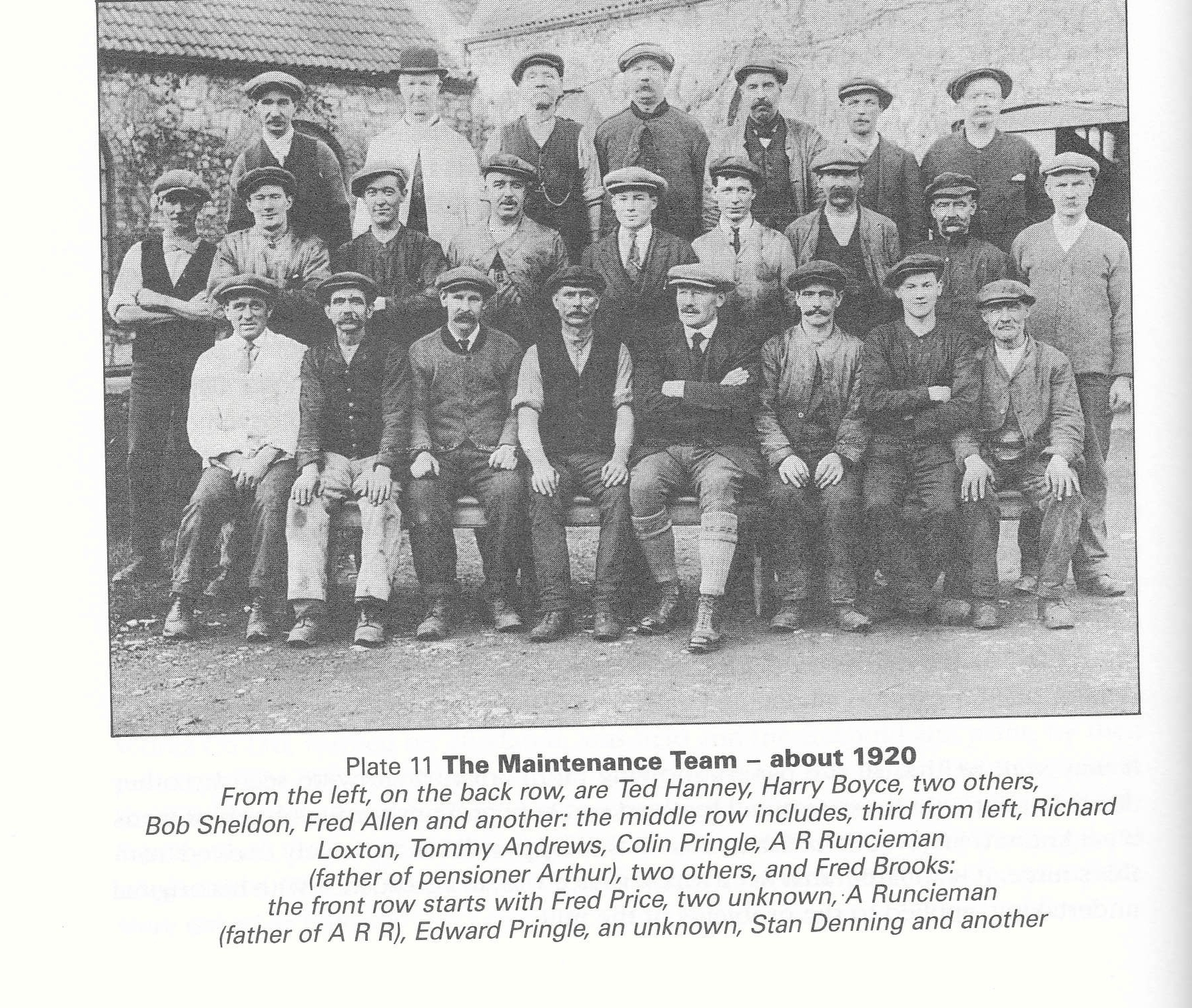
The 'Maintenance Team' circa 1920. (MIll 364)

The name of the mill was changed in 1862 to 'Mendip Mill'. In 1886 major changes resulted in the mill's name to be changed again, this time to ‘St Cuthberts Mill’. Following these changes new effluent equipment and increased power was introduced to the mill.

In 1897, the landmark chimney was built using 300,000 specially made bricks.

In 1907, No 2 Fourdrinier machine was installed. It is the same one still in use now, as it was rebuilt as a mould machine.

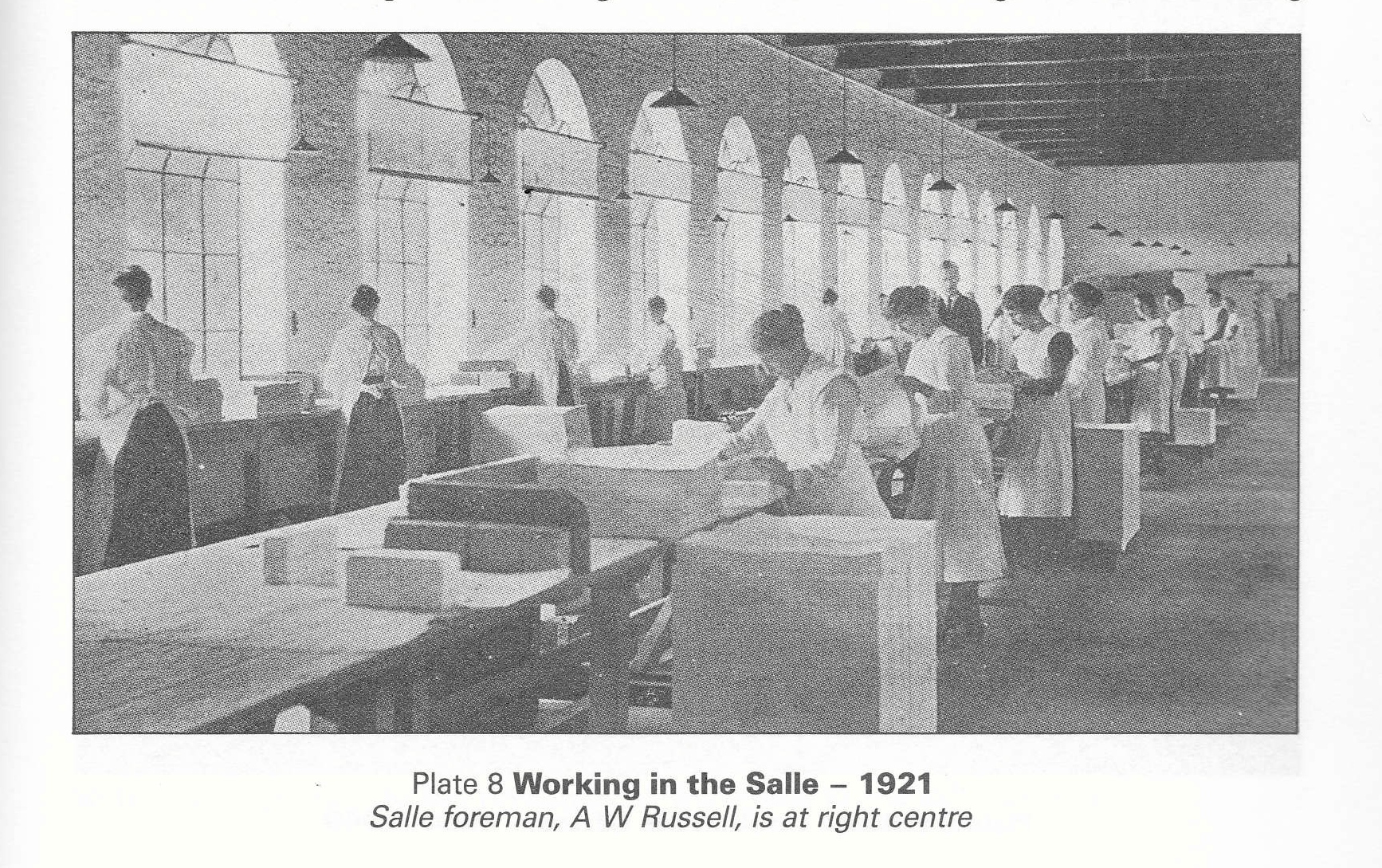
Working in the 'Salle', 1921. (Mill 364).

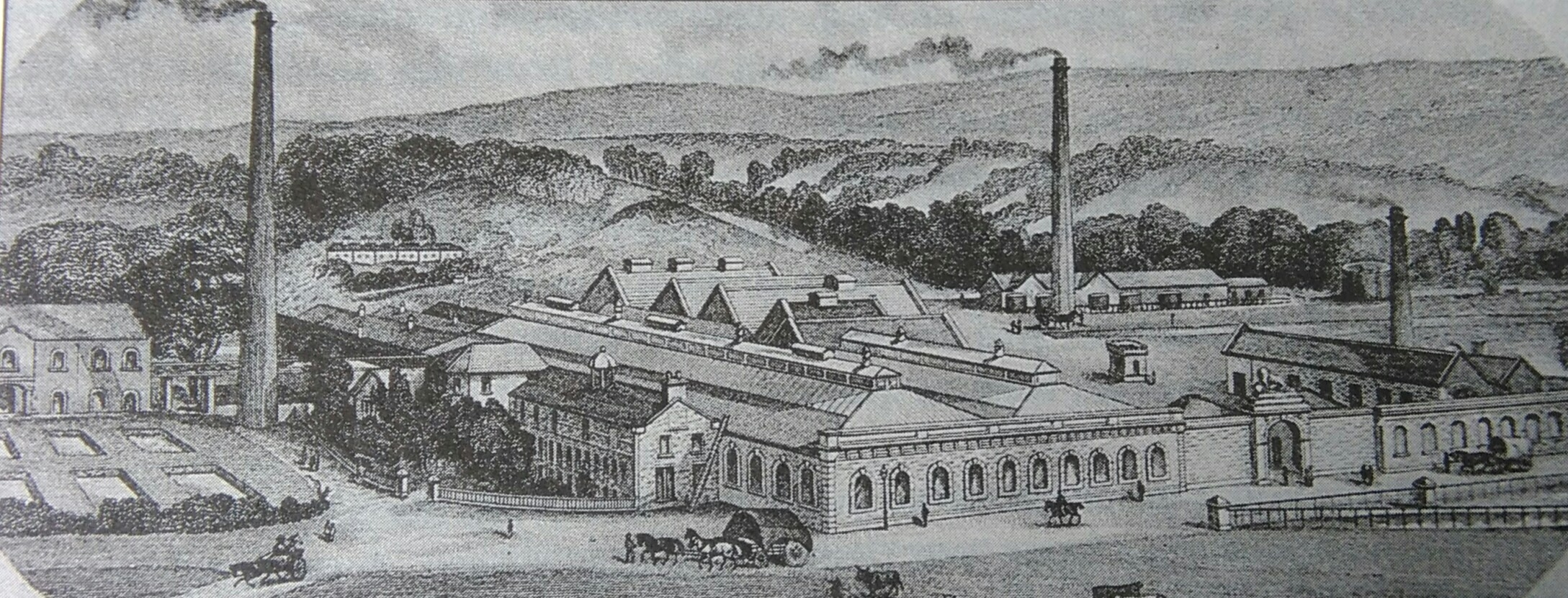
Burgess and Co's Mendip Mill circa 1935

The company Inveresk purchased St Cuthberts Mill in 1938, and took over the nearby Wookey Hole Mill. This led to Inveresk gaining experience in running a mould machine, and they began making artist papers with the purchase of the TH Saunders business in 1959.

PM 1 machine installed in 1954.

Wookey Hole purchased the rights to produce TH Saunders paper (Thomas Harry Saunders) (originally developed in 1920.) Those rights came to St Cuthberts Mill in 1959, with TH Saunders rebranded as Saunders Waterford in the 1980s.

The Wookey Hole mould machine was transferred to the St Cuthberts Mill site after the sale of Wookey Hole Mill in 1972. Hand made paper continued at St Cuthberts Mill into 1976.

Bockingford rights were bought from Whatman in 1975.

Somerset paper was developed in the mid-1970s at St Cuthberts Mill. Michael Ginsburg, an American paper dealer (Legion Paper), is credited with giving the paper its name. It struck him as he was driving to the mill and came to the sign marking the Somerset border.

1984 saw an increase in demand for watercolour paper. After a rebuild, the mill turned to using the PM2 machine purely for the production of these papers.

"In 1990, Somerset paper was chosen for a fund-raising lithograph, based on watercolour paintings created by H.R.H. the Prince of Wales. The lithographs were produced on a 300gsm (140lb) paper grade, which incorporated not only the Somerset watermark, but the Prince of Wales’s own crest too."

Improvements were made in 1991 to the PM1 machine, which was specialising in the creation of pre-impregnated papers for the cabinet market.

In early 2010, the PM 1 machine was sold. Following this, in October 2010, St Cuthberts Mill Ltd was created following the fall of Inveresk, resulting in the mill specialising in artist's papers, being produced on the remaining mould machine PM2.

The mill was sold to F.I.L.A. in September 2016.
