= Canson =

French paper manufacturer

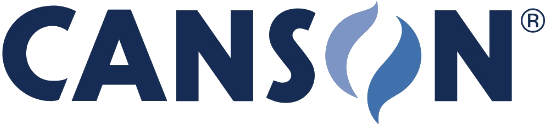
- Formerly: Canson & Montgolfier
- Type: Private
- Industry: Pulp and paper
- Founded: 1557; 469 years ago ("Canson" name first used in 1801)
- Founder: Jacques Montgolfier
- Headquarters: Annonay, France
- Area served: Europe, Americas, Asia, Australia
- Products: Fine art papers
- Number of employees: 450
- Parent: F.I.L.A. S.p.A. (2016–present)
- Website: canson.com

Canson is a French manufacturer of fine art paper and related products. The company, established in 1557 by the Montgolfier family, produces papers for different uses in fine art, including watercolor, oil, acrylic, photo papers, among others.

== History ==
=== Origins ===
The story goes that Jean Montgolfier was taken prisoner by the Turks during the Crusades and was compelled to work in a paper mill in Damascus. There he learned how to produce paper, and he brought the knowledge back to Europe when he regained his freedom.

=== Annonay, the beginning of the Montgolfier success ===
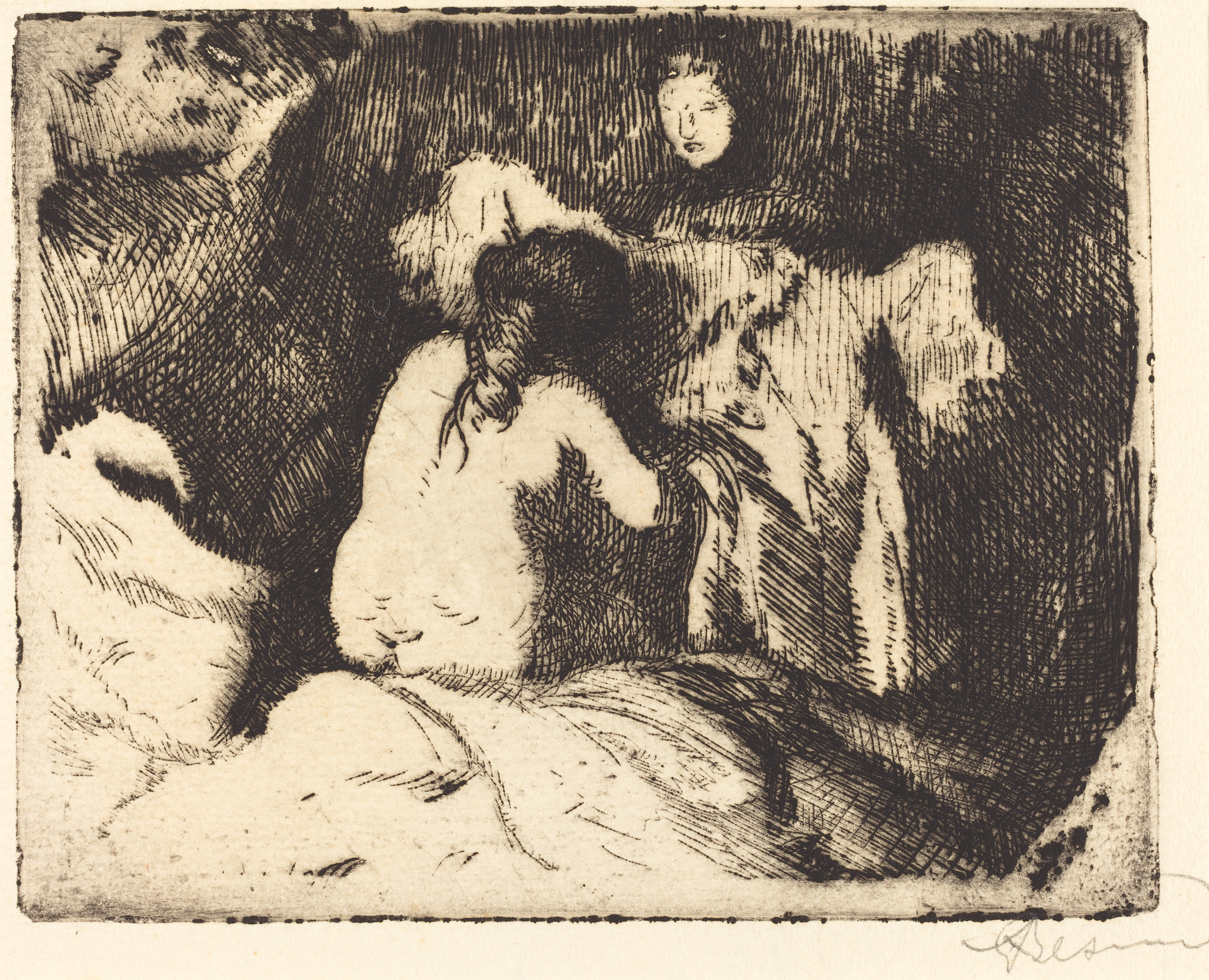
An etching by Paul-Albert Besnard printed on Canson laid paper

In 1485, Antoine Vidalon created a cereal mill. The Vidalon Paper Mills (Vidalon-le-Haut and Vidalon-le-Bas) were most probably created in the sixteenth century on the river Deûme in Davézieux parish near Annonay, France, from the cereal mill that was transformed. Born in the region of Beaujolais, the Vidalon family were friends with Jean Montgolfier, who was also a papermaker in the Réveillon mill. Jean sent his two sons, Raymond and Michel, to Vidalon, so they could improve their knowledge. In 1693, Raymond and Michel Montgolfier married the daughters of Antoine Chelles, the owner of the paper mills. The Montgolfier family subsequently ran the mills.

Pierre Montgolfier (1700–1793), son of Raymond, was a brilliant manufacturer that aimed in modernizing the profession. Thanks to him, Vidalon mills grew up rapidly. For instance, he developed the Dutch beaters to replace the mallet troughs. One of his 16 children, Joseph Montgolfier was a brilliant inventor. He developed the Bleu de Prusse colour and a new device to raise water ... With his brother Etienne Montgolfier, he created the first hot air balloon, the montgolfière. They used their own paper to make the envelope and they engineered a heating system to inflate it. The first flight took place in Vidalon on December 14, 1782. A memorial still exists in the former paper mill's courtyard, nearby the native house of the Montgolfier brothers and the current Papeteries Canson & Montgolfier museum. Their mark is visible in the logo, it consists of a stylized hot air balloon - a reference to the Montgolfier brothers, Joseph-Michel and Jacques-Étienne, pioneers of the hot air balloon. In 1783, [Louis XVI ennobled Pierre Montgolfier and his family, both on account of the aerostatic invention and on that of the strides that they have spurred in the papermaking industry. In 1784, the paper mills were granted the name "Manufacture Royale".

=== Barthélémy Barou de la Lombardière de Canson ===
One of the daughters of (Jacques-)Etienne Montgolfier, Alexandrine, married Barthélémy de Canson who ran the mills after Etienne's death in 1799. In 1801, the company became "Montgolfier et Canson", then "Canson-Montgolfier" in 1807. Barthélémy de Canson made the paper mill grow and developed many new processes: mass dying, the continuous paper machine, the suction boxes, mass sizing... He has also invented the tracing paper in 1807 thanks to high refining of the paper pulp. He installed the first Robert machine around 1820. In 1853, Canson invented a medium for positive and negative prints. He perfected it and was granted numerous patents in France and abroad. This paper cut out the need to use platinum or gold chloride, so was easier and cheaper to use. In 1860, the Montgolfier papermills were the largest in France. The company was registered as "Societe Anonyme" under the name "Anciennes manufactures Canson & Montgolfier" in 1881.

=== Canson and the artists ===
Canson created for Jean-Auguste-Dominique Ingres, a friend of Adélaïde de Montgolfier, daughter of Etienne de Montgolfier, a laid drawing paper.

In 1910, Gustave Maillol developed, for his uncle Aristide, a special paper for printmaking. He installed his small factory in Montval near Paris. He had to stop because of World War I and, when he came back home, his equipments were scattered. He then asked Canson in Annonay to develop and produce "Les Papiers de Montval", that are still sold today. Many artists have used Canson paper: Edgar Degas, Joan Miró, Fernand Léger, Marc Chagall, Picasso, Delacroix, Matisse....

=== 20th century ===
In 1926, Canson opened a subsidiary in New York City, USA.

In 1947, Canson created the famous French « pochette », so teachers no longer have to transport heavy stacks of pads.

In 1956, Blanchet et Kléber de Rives joined the mills of d'Arches, Johannot d'Annonay, et du Marais and created Arjomari (Arches, Johannot, Marais, Rives). The Arjomari company acquired Papeteries Canson & Montgolfier in 1976.
In 1990, Arjomari merged with the Wiggins Teape Appleton group and became the Arjo Wiggins group.

In late 2006, the group Hamelin acquired Canson with all its subsidiaries. Hamelin is a European supplier of school, office and fine art products. Oxford and Elba are brands of the Hamelin group.

=== Present ===
Canson employs 400 persons in Europe, in North America, in South America and in Australia

In October 2016, Canson was acquired from Hamelin by the Milan-based F.I.L.A. Group.

== Products ==
The following chart contains all the Canson product lines, sold under the brands "Canson" and "Arches".

| Category | Range of papers |
|---|---|
| Fine Art | Watercolour, oil, acrylic, pastel, graphic arts, printmaking |
| School | School lines |
| Professional Design | Architectural scale models |
| Technical & digital | Printing & photography, technical drawing, office |
| Arts & Craft | Handicraft, leisure photo paper |

There are many ranges of products: Montval, a range for watercolour papers; Mi-Teintes, coloured paper for pastel, drawing and handicrafts; Ingres Vidalon, a coloured laid paper; "C" à Grain and 1557, drawing paper; Figueras, paper for oil and acrylic; Infinity: digital fine art and photographic paper; XL, products for students

Cotton paper is durable and holds up to water, rubber cement and wax treatments. They also make sketch pads, rolls and sheets of paper with different tooth and weight. This is for graphite, pastel, charcoal and ink use.

Canson also produces specialty sheets and framing board for chalk pastel use under the brand-name Mi-Teintes. Composed of 60% cotton, the sheets are heavy, rough in texture, and come in 60 colors.

== Canson and the Louvre ==
Since 2010, Canson is a major sponsor of the Louvre museum and is supporting the following actions: the Internet website of the museum, the digitisation of the prints and drawings department's collection. Canson has also sponsored Le Papier à l'œuvre, an exhibition on interaction between paper and artists, which took place from June to September 2011 in the Louvre museum. Some works of great artists were done on Canson paper: Nu bleu IV from Henri Matisse and Combustion, mèche noire et traces de brûlures sur papier Canson II from Christian Jaccard, as well as a contemporary work from Dominique de Beir, Le Blanc, c'est la nuit.
