= Yvonne Pickering Carter =

American painter

- Born: February 6, 1939 (age 86); Washington, D.C., United States
- Education: Howard University

Yvonne Pickering Carter (born 1939) is an American painter, performance artist, and educator. She has worked in media including watercolor and collage.

Born February 6, 1939, in Washington, D.C., Carter lived for a time with her family in Charleston, South Carolina. Her father was a dentist there, but also knew how to build houses and furniture, a skill he taught Carter as a girl. Carter earned both her bachelor's degree and a Master of Fine Arts degree at Howard University where she studied under Lila Asher.

She gave birth to a daughter around 1968.

In 1976, Carter and her husband purchased a vacant building that had been Murray & Son Funeral Home at 10th and O Streets NW in Washington D.C. The building had been empty, scavenged and was in decay for five years. Using the building knowledge she had from her father, Carter oversaw the rehabilitation of the building into a large living and studio space. The work took six months and Carter reported that they spent around $55,000.

Carter worked as an abstract painter for many years, though her process grew to include watercolor, collage, and performance art. At one time, Carter worked with very large canvases, presenting one work at the Martin Luther King Jr. Memorial Library in a 15 x 40 foot space. Her need for large canvas led her to purchasing supply from a sailboat supplier in Baltimore. Her pivot to performance art came after a time of experimentation with her canvases- draping them on the wall, stitching and padding them, or cutting them into strips. Carter described literally taking a canvas off of the wall and wrapping herself in it. Her first performance was in 1981, having never witnessed a performance art piece before herself. Her performance work came to incorporate poetry, sound, and movement. One performance, on January 8, 1984, at the Baltimore Museum of Art, Carter used music composed by Lawrence Moss, who was director of composition at the University of Maryland.

Her work has appeared in group exhibitions around the United States, including in an exhibit on "Celebrate African-American Art: Yesterday and Today", which appeared in the Art at 100 Pearl Street gallery in Hartford, Connecticut, in 1989. Among the institutions that featured her multimedia performances are the National Museum of Women in the Arts, the Walters Art Gallery, and the University of Maryland, Baltimore, among others. Her work is in the collections of the Gibbes Museum of Art, the North Carolina Museum of Art, the University of the District of Columbia, and the Pennsylvania Academy of the Fine Arts. Carter taught at the University of the District of Columbia for many years, serving as Chair of Mass Media, Visual and Performing Arts, before retiring to Charleston, South Carolina, where she opened the Gallery Cornelia to showcase African-American art.

== Notable works ==
- Linear Variation series: Untitled, North Carolina Museum of Art, Raleigh, North Carolina
- Diminutive Folded Linear Series #4, 1978, Gibbes Museum of Art, Charleston, South Carolina
- L.S.D.F. #50, 1979, North Carolina Museum of Art, Raleigh, North Carolina
- Water Series #30, 1985, Pennsylvania Academy of the Fine Arts, Philadelphia, Pennsylvania
