= Linear Variation series: Untitled =

1975 painting by Yvonne Pickering Carter

- Artist: Yvonne Pickering Carter
- Year: 1975
- Medium: Watercolor on paper
- Dimensions: 28.6 cm × 38.1 cm (11.3 in × 15.0 in)
- Location: North Carolina Museum of Art, Raleigh, North Carolina

Linear Variation series: Untitled is a painting by Yvonne Pickering Carter. It is in the collection of the North Carolina Museum of Art in Raleigh, North Carolina in the United States.

The painting comprises a series of abstract watercolor paint strokes on a piece of hand cut white paper. Carter's signature is located on the lower right of the front of the painting: Yvonne Pickering Carter '75.

Linear Variation series: Untitled was purchased by the North Carolina Museum of Art in 1975 with funding from the National Endowment for the Arts and the North Carolina State Art Society.
