= Assassin's Creed (comic series) =

Comic book series by Titan Comics

Publication information
- Publisher: Titan Comics
- Schedule: Monthly
- Publication date: October 2015 – December 2016
- No. of issues: 14
- Main character(s): Charlotte de la Cruz; Galina Voronina

Creative team
- Written by: Anthony Del Col; Conor McCreery
- Artist: Neil Edwards
- Letterer: Comicraft
- Colorist: Ivan Nunes

Collected editions
- Assassin's Creed Volume 1: Trial by Fire: ISBN 9781782763055
- Assassin's Creed Volume 2: Setting Sun: ISBN 9781782763062
- Assassin's Creed Volume 3: Homecoming: ISBN 9781782763109

Assassin's Creed, also known as Assassin's Creed: Assassins, is a comic book series published by Titan Comics. Set in the fictional universe of Ubisoft's Assassin's Creed video game series, the comic follows the same premise as the games, involving a millennia-old struggle between the Assassin Brotherhood, who fight for peace and freedom, and the Templar Order, who believe in peace through control. The comic is primarily set in the modern day and follows Charlotte de la Cruz, a banker who is recruited by the Assassins to help them in their fight against the Templars. Through the use of a machine called the Animus, Charlotte relives the genetic memories of her ancestors at various points in history, acquiring skills and information needed to complete her missions.

The comic was written by Kill Shakespeare and Sherlock Holmes vs. Harry Houdini writers, Anthony Del Col and Conor McCreery, and illustrated by Neil Edwards. Originally envisioned as an ongoing series with a planned duration of at least three years, it ran from October 2015 to December 2016, spanning fourteen issues and three story arcs. Each story arc was later collected and published as individual volumes: Volume 1: Trial by Fire, comprising issues No. 1–5 and released on 21 June 2016; Volume 2: Setting Sun, comprising issues No. 6–10 and released on 6 December 2016; and Volume 3: Homecoming, comprising issues No. 11–14 and released on 23 May 2017.

In September 2016, Titan announced that, following the release of its fourteenth issue, Assassin's Creed: Assassins, along with its companion series, Assassin's Creed: Templars, would be relaunched under a different title and with a new creative team. Titled Assassin's Creed: Uprising, the new series ran for twelve issues from February 2017 to June 2018, and served as a conclusion to the overarching Phoenix Project story arc that had begun in Assassin's Creed: Unity.

== Plot synopsis ==
=== Trial by Fire ===
In 2015, Charlotte de la Cruz is an overqualified banker living in San Diego, California, who in her free time enjoys chasing down conspiracy theories and playing on her Helix console, which unknowingly grants access to the genetic memories of real Assassins and Templars. One night, after returning home, Charlotte is surprised to find the Assassins Galina Voronina and Xavier Chan in her apartment, who inform her of the truth about their Brotherhood's war with the Templars. Just then, several Templar agents break into the apartment, seeking to silence Charlotte, but she escapes with Galina and Xavier's help. Taken to the Assassins' hideout near the Salton Sea, Charlotte meets the team's technician, Kody Adams, and learns of another Assassin, Joseph Laurier, who is suspected of betraying the Brotherhood and collaborating with the Templars to search for a Piece of Eden. However, the Assassins want to be certain of Joseph's treason, so they have Charlotte enter an Animus to relive the memories of her 17th-century Assassin ancestor, Thomas "Tom" Stoddard.

In 1692, Tom travels to Salem, Massachusetts, and meets local Assassin Jennifer Querry, who explains that the town was engulfed by mass hysteria and paranoia after several girls became inexplicably ill. While most residents blamed the incident on witchcraft, the Templars realized that a Piece of Eden was responsible and started the witch trials as a cover to search for it. Determined to find the artifact before the Templars, Tom and Jennifer break into a warehouse where those accused of witchcraft are imprisoned. They free a mute boy, David, and a girl named Dorothy Osborne, who claims that she can lead them to the Piece of Eden. Meanwhile, the Templars Samuel Parris and William Stoughton, alerted to the Assassins' arrival, decide to use them to find the Piece of Eden. Against Parris' protests, Stoughton incites the Salem townsfolk to attack the Assassins, forcing them, David, and Dorothy to escape. During the struggle, Tom threatens Dorothy's life after realizing she lied, only for the girl to become possessed by an unknown entity, revealing that Dorothy herself is the Piece of Eden. In the present, Charlotte struggles to remain synchronized with Tom due to the latter's brutal methods, and the Assassins argue over Joseph's loyalty. Believing that he will betray their location to the Templars, the team decides to abandon their hideout, taking the Animus with them.

Tom, Jennifer, Dorothy and David attempt to flee from the mob pursuing them, but during the chase Jennifer is shot. Tom abandons her and David, putting the mission first, and attempts to bring Dorothy to the Salem docks. When Dorothy again becomes possessed, the mysterious entity identifies itself as Consus, an Isu, and talks directly to Charlotte, telling her to seek "the ones with great knowledge." Jennifer eventually catches up with Tom and Dorothy, but she has been followed by the Templars, who promptly capture everyone. Tom and Jennifer are tortured and, though they manage to break free after a distraction from Consus, Jennifer is killed by Stoughton. Believing Jennifer to have been Joseph's ancestor, the modern-day Assassins conclude that Joseph could not have possibly known the location of the Piece of Eden, meaning he is deceiving the Templars. Galina and Xavier subsequently leave to rescue him, but Charlotte remains unconvinced and returns to the Animus. After Dorothy ends her own life to prevent the Templars from exploiting her powers, a furious Stoughton decides to execute Tom in retaliation. However, he is stopped by Parris, who has grown weary of Stoughton's violent methods. Declaring the Templars' mission in Salem to be at an end, Parris allows Tom and David to leave. Later, as Tom buries Jennifer and Dorothy, he reflects on his newfound convictions and, realizing David is Jennifer's son, decides to adopt him.

With the revelation that David was Joseph's ancestor all along, Charlotte concludes that Galina and Xavier are walking into a trap and tries to rescue them. However, she arrives too late, as Joseph has killed Xavier and crippled Galina. Confronting Charlotte, Joseph explains how he sought revenge on the Assassins for the death of his lover and tries to convince Charlotte that the Brotherhood is using her. He then reveals that he only feigned loyalty to the Templars so they would help him achieve his vengeance, and detonates a hidden explosive that kills multiple Templars. Charlotte fights and overpowers Joseph before carrying the injured Galina to safety. However, as the two escape, they discover that Charlotte inadvertently killed an innocent employee who had caught her while infiltrating the building. Though riddled with guilt, Charlotte elects to stay with the Assassins and joins Galina and Kody in going on the run.

=== Setting Sun ===
In 2016, Charlotte, Galina, and Kody are hiding out in a hotel in Mexico City. When two doctors arrive to treat Galina's injuries, she kills one of them, who was an undercover Templar, and knocks the other one out. After the Assassins move to another hotel, Charlotte deduces that the "keepers of knowledge" Consus told her to seek are the elusive hacking collective Erudito. Learning that there will be an Erudito meeting soon and that the location is password-encrypted, Charlotte enters the Animus to search for a clue in the memories of her 16th-century Incan ancestor, Quila.

In 1536, Quila is a chasqui (courier) who prides herself on being faster than every male chasqui in the Empire, although most do not share her enthusiasm, believing she should simply be a "proper wife". One day, after a courier refuses to give Quila a package to deliver, she decides to steal it from him. Checking the package, she discovers it is a quipu (message) detailing a plot to assassinate Emperor Manco. While trying to steal a horse, Quila is attacked by the same courier from earlier. Fortunately, she is rescued by the horse's owner, Don Gonzalo Pardo. Gonzalo agrees to take Quila to Cuzco, but after learning of the assassination plot, he tries to abandon Quila so he could personally save Emperor Manco. Quila knocks out Gonzalo to stop him, and they are both captured by arriving Conquistadors. In the present, the Assassins locate a high-ranking Templar who might lead them to Joseph, but Charlotte botches the mission, allowing the Templar to escape. After an argument with Galina, Charlotte leaves to search for batteries for the Animus on her own, while questioning whether she is fit for the Assassin life. Galina and Kody go looking for her, but the latter is captured by members of a drug cartel, who seek revenge on the Assassins for attacking the girlfriend of their leader Arturo Viera—the doctor who was knocked out by Galina.

In the Animus, Quila and Gonzalo are taken to Cuzco, which is under siege by Emperor Manco's forces. Gonzalo manages to free himself and Quila, and the pair escape the besieged city, although their quipu is broken in the process. A furious Quila ends her partnership with Gonzalo and goes to warn Manco about the assassination plot. Without any proof, however, she is turned away. Quila then decides to seek the aid of her ex-husband, Ayar, whose father, Tuti Cusi, is a councilor to the Emperor and might convince him there is a threat against his life. However, Tuti Cusi instead accuses Quila and Gonzalo of being conspirators and orders their arrest. In the present, Charlotte and Galina storm Estadio Azteca, where Viera's men are holding Kody hostage. After the Assassins take out most of Viera's men, a group of armed Templars, led by Ortega Sanchez, arrive via helicopter and kill the remaining cartel members, including Viera himself. Charlotte makes a deal with Sanchez to spare Galina and Kody in exchange for the location of the Erudito meeting, but she needs more time to learn the password. Sanchez accepts the deal and allows Charlotte to return to the Animus.

Quila and Gonzalo are sentenced to death by Tuti Cusi, who further taunts them by revealing that Gonzalo is an Assassin who killed Emperor Atahualpa; however, Gonzalo later clarifies to Quila that his mission had been to protect the Emperor, and that his failure to do so has been haunting him ever since. As the two are about to be sacrificed, they are saved by Ayar, who has chosen to believe Quila's innocence, still being in love with her. Determining that Tuti Cusi himself is behind the plot to kill Emperor Manco, Quila and Ayar try to stop the assassination. They nearly fail, but thanks to Gonzalo's timely arrival, the would-be assassin is eliminated, and Tuti Cusi is knocked out by Ayar. In the aftermath, Quila is appointed the Emperor's official chasqui for her heroism, and is offered a place in the Brotherhood by Gonzalo, who tells her to use the password "Don Gonzalo Pardo" should she wish to join. Using this password, Charlotte is able to decrypt the location of the Erudito meeting, learning it will take place in Argentina. She then surrenders herself to Sanchez to ensure her friends' safety, but the Templar convoy transporting them is attacked by Viera's cartel, who seek revenge on the Templars for their leader's death. Charlotte escapes during the chaos and reunites with Galina and Kody before all three fly to Buenos Aires. There, they are led to a meeting with an Erudito contact, who Charlotte is shocked to discover is her grandmother Florencia.

=== Homecoming ===
During a meeting between Erudito's leaders, a debate ensues as Florencia brought the Assassins on board without the others' consent. Florencia argues that it's time for Erudito to evolve and take the fight straight to the Templars, having learned about the Phoenix Project and its goal to resurrect the Isu. Erudito believes Consus to be instrumental in preventing this, and suspects that the Assassin Giovanni Borgia had a second encounter with him, which was hidden from the Templars. While Erudito does not have access to Giovanni's memories, Charlotte's ancestor, Hiram Stoddard, was a close acquaintance of Giovanni's, meaning he could have witnessed this encounter. As such, Charlotte enters the Animus to relive Hiram's memories.

In 1516 Greece, Hiram steals an Apple of Eden before being attacked by Giovanni. After a grueling fight, Giovanni emerges victorious and recovers the Apple, but cannot bring himself to kill Hiram and instead leaves him with a book given to him by their Mentor, Ezio Auditore. This triggers a memory set one year earlier, in 1515, when Giovanni and Hiram were both Assassin apprentices training under Ezio. Hiram was the more skilled of the two, causing him to be favored by their mutual love interest, Elena. Ezio noticed Giovanni's jealousy towards Hiram and encouraged him that there were multiple paths to becoming an Assassin before giving him a book to read and reflect on. When Ezio later received word from his friend Michelangelo about a Templar passing through Florence with an Apple of Eden, he sent Hiram and Giovanni to retrieve the artifact.

In the present, Galina starts training Erudito agents to use Assassin tactics, and leads a team to Mogadishu, Somalia, to locate Joseph. He ambushes Galina, but the Erudito agents manage to subdue him, just as reports of Erudito's island hideout being under attack come in. Realizing Joseph is the only one with a plane, the team convinces him to fly them back to the island in exchange for an opportunity to talk with Charlotte. In the Animus, Hiram and Giovanni's mission in Florence is ultimately unsuccessful as the Templar manages to escape with the Apple of Eden. The two blame each other for the mission's failure, and Giovanni, in an act of jealousy, attempts to ruin his rival's chances with Elena by telling her about Hiram's affair with another woman. When Elena confronts Hiram, a fight ensues between him and Giovanni, which Elena attempts to break up. During the fight, Consus possesses Giovanni and leaves a cryptic message for Charlotte, terrifying Elena and causing her to accidentally fall to her death. While Giovanni awakens with no recollection of what just happened, a devastated Hiram blames him for Elena's death and vows revenge.

Having obtained the information she sought, Charlotte exits the Animus just as Erudito's base is attacked by the Templars. After Kody is killed, Charlotte mourns her friend's death and joins Florencia and the remaining Erudito members as they look for a way off the island. However, the Templars appear to be one step ahead of the group, and Charlotte realizes that Ortega Sanchez has been tracking her movements the entire time. To make up for her mistake, Charlotte decides to lure the Templars away so that everyone else can escape. Meanwhile, Galina, Joseph, and Erudito member My'shell Lemair arrive on the island, where they attack and destroy a Templar ship, though Joseph is mortally injured in the process. After Galina and My'shell reunite with the others, they are all picked up by an Assassin helicopter that has answered their distress call, and the group rescues Charlotte, who was cornered by Sanchez and his men. As they fly away from the island, Charlotte reflects on her recent experiences and declares that she will not rest until the Templars are defeated.

== Reception ==
The first volume, Assassin's Creed: Trial by Fire, received generally positive reviews. PSU.com called Trial by Fire #1 "[a]n intriguing first chapter in the ongoing Assassin's Creed comic book series that shows great promise." The series has been recognized by The Guardian as example of one of the best comics based on video games, and was featured and reviewed on numerous websites such as Bleeding Cool, Slackjaw Punks, and Flickering Myth.
