= Gus Scarvelis =

Gus "Kostas" Stephanos Scarvelis (Greek: Κώστας Στέφανος Σκαρβέλης; June 21, 1915 Kardamyla, Chios, Greece - November 3, 1989 Toledo, Ohio, US) was a Greek-born American research engineer and inventor creating many patents for Georgia Pacific Corrugated LLC and OI Glass while working for Owens Illinois in Toledo, Ohio such as the "Process for making wet-strength paper and product thereof" and "Method of extruding a foamed plastic composition" and prior, working for the Continental Can Company such as "Pouch manufacturing means and method" for "certain food products, notably sliced cheeses and sliced meats" in Mount Vernon, Ohio. In 1950, Scarvelis was mentioned in the journal, American Society for Metals: "Metal Progress - Volumes 57-58."

== Early life ==
Scarvelis was born on Jun 21, 1915 in the village of Kardamyla on the island of Chios in Greece. Scarvelis is the son of Greek-born immigrants, Stephanos "Steve" Scarvelis and Giannoula. Scarvelis' siblings are Peter "Panagiotis" Scarvelis, Mary "Maria" Scarvelis and Michael Scarvelis and half-sister Ploumitsa Skarveli.

At the age of 7, Scarvelis immigrated with his mother Giannoula, sister Maria and brother Michael to the US in 1923. They arrived on November 1, 1923 on the Madonna Ship from Piraeus, Athens, Greece. They joined his father Stephanos, a goldsmith, and his brother Pete, who already immigrated to the USA, in Wheeling, West Virginia. Within a year, Scarvelis' mother unexpectedly died in Weirton, West Virginia, US, and not long after, his father. Scarvelis, now orphaned, was now under the care of his older three siblings, Peter, Maria and Michael. His brothers were working in the steel mills. His sibling, Peter, subsequently died while working, in a steel mill accident on 12 Jun 1946 (aged 39). Thus, the young Gus Scarvelis was determined to get a college education.

== Education ==
In 1935, Scarvelis attended Rochester High School, in Rochester, Pennsylvania. In 1938, for university, Scarvelis attended Georgia Tech, originally named the Georgia School of Technology. Scarvelis later transferred to Jersey City, New Jersey, to work for Joseph Dixon Crucible Co and commuted to Brooklyn to attend Brooklyn Polytechnical Institute of Technology of New York, now called New York University Tandon School of Engineering. He had a gap in Education due to the achieved a degree in Metallurgical Engineering in 1949.

== WWII ==
Scarvelis was a veteran of the Second World War; he enlisted in the US Army on Feb 9, 1945, and was discharged on Dec 5, 1946.

== Marriage ==
Gus met American-born Greek, Falea Adams and married in New Jersey. Adams was the daughter of Greek-born immigrants George Adamakos "Adams" and Helen, from Sparta, Greece. Gus and Falea married on June 26, 1945, in Florida. Gus and Falea had 3 children: George Scarvelis, Stephen Scarvelis and Jalna Scarvelis. They first lived in Passaic, NJ then in 1950 moved to Mount Vernon, Ohio. Thereafter, they moved to Toledo, Ohio. Gus and Falea had 6 grandchildren, George (passed at birth), Gus, Michael, Lea, Ellie and Kristi.

== Work, patents and inventions ==
In Jersey City, New Jersey, Scarvelis worked for Joseph Dixon Crucible Co. In 1950, Scarvelis moved to Mount Vernon, Ohio and worked for the Continental Can Company as a research engineer, inventor creating the patents "Pouch manufacturing means and method" for "certain food products, notably sliced cheeses and sliced meats" in Mount Vernon, Ohio. In 1950, Scarvelis was mentioned in the journal, American Society for Metals: "Metal Progress - Volumes 57-58." Later, Scarvelis moved to Toledo, Ohio and worked for Owens Illinois. as a research engineer and inventor creating many patents for Georgia Pacific Corrugated LLC and OI Glass while working for Owens Illinois in Toledo, Ohio such as the "Process for making wet-strength paper and product thereof" and "Method of extruding a foamed plastic composition". Working for the Owens Illinois Corporation for 20 years, Scarvelis retired in 1977.

== Affiliations ==
Scarvelis was a member of various Greek organizations in Toledo, Ohio. The Holy Trinity Greek Orthodox Cathedral, Order of AHEPA, and a Charter Member of the Evezones. Scarvelis was also a member of the Zenobia Shrine, Rubicon Lodge #237 F&AM of the Masonic Order.

== Death ==
Gus Scarvelis died on November 3, 1989 in Toledo, Ohio, preceding his wife by 24 years, Falea Scarvelis, who died on February 12, 2013.
