= Classmate (stationery) =

Indian brand of student stationery products

- Industry: Consumer goods
- Founded: 2003; 23 years ago
- Headquarters: Delhi, India
- Area served: India, Nepal
- Key people: Ayaan Ali (CEO)
- Products: Notebooks; Pens; Pencils; Mathematical instruments Erasers; Pencil sharpeners Geometry boxes Art stationery
- Parent: ITC Limited
- Website: www.classmateshop.com

Classmate is an Indian brand of student stationery products. ITC Limited (formerly Indian Tobacco Company) launched its Classmate brand in 2003. with the notebooks category. Subsequently, Classmate added pens, pencils, mechanical pencils and geometry boxes to its portfolio. It uses eco-friendly and elemental chlorine-free paper for its notebooks.

== Products ==
Classmate products include notebooks, pens, pencils, mechanical pencils, diaries, mathematical drawing instruments, scholastics, erasers, sharpeners and scales and art stationery products.

== Activities ==
=== Classmate Ideas for India challenge ===
Classmate launched a program called Classmate Ideas for India challenge. This was a part of the company's centenary initiative. The nationwide program would invite ideas of the youth who have the potential to transform India. Classmate Ideas for India challenge plans to reach out to 2.5 million students across 30 cities, 500 schools and 200 colleges across the country. The CII-ITC Centre of Excellence for Sustainable Development, WWF India, the Tony Blair Faith Foundation, Janaagraha and the Akshaya Patra Foundation among others are the program partners for the event. The program will encourage the finalists with an internship with relevant program partners, besides cash prizes and other rewards. Additionally, the top five winners would be sent to a one-week international study tour.

=== Discussions ===
ITC Classmate hosted a discussion on the subject titled "Principal, Parents and Children: Building a Relationship of Mutuality". The panelists agreed on the need for greater student involvement in what they are taught, as well as the method of imparting education.

=== Corporate social responsibility ===
Every Classmate notebook carries ITC's Corporate Social Responsibility message on its back. For every four Classmate notebooks purchased, ITC contributes ₹1 to its social development initiative that supports, among other projects (including development of tobacco plantations to increase cigarette production), primary education.

=== Classmate Young Authors Contest ===
The Classmate Young Authors Contest 2004 (CYAC 2004) was initiated by ITC Limited to provide a platform for budding writers among students to showcase their talent and an opportunity to develop it through interaction with some of the country's leading literary icons.

=== Classmate Spelling Bee ===
Classmate Spelling bee has completed nine seasons as of 2016 and has been described as one of India's largest spelling competitions. It aims to bring the best spellers together from every part of the nation, focusing on honing the spelling skills of Indian students in a fun and educational way. The last season winner received a cash prize of 2 lakh along with a sponsored trip to Washington DC, USA, to witness the Scripps National Spelling Bee 2015 with a parent.

=== WWF-India and ITC Ltd. promoting responsible forestry ===
This first took off in 2009. ITC Classmate was the first Indian company to join the Global Forest and Trade Network (GFTN). Paperkraft Premium Business Paper is a product of ITC Limited and is the country's greenest paper mill. ITC contributes towards saving the environment: through ozone treatment and ECF technology to eliminate toxicity in the industrial effluents released by them into the ecosystem, and in a large scale through reforestation and water conservation by planting 8 trees for every tree used, which has greened over 1 lakh hectares since 2008.

== See also ==
- Stationery
- Doms (company)
