= Water Series Number 30 =

Painting by Yvonne Pickering Carter

Water Series #30
- Artist: Yvonne Pickering Carter
- Year: 1985
- Medium: Watercolor on paper collage
- Dimensions: 55.245 cm × 75.2475 cm (21.750 in × 29.6250 in)
- Location: Pennsylvania Academy of the Fine Arts, Philadelphia

Water Series #30 is a 1985 painting by Yvonne Pickering Carter. It is in the collection of the Pennsylvania Academy of the Fine Arts in Philadelphia, Pennsylvania in the United States.

The painting comprises a collection of pieces of paper, folded and sewed together, painted with colorful, abstract watercolor paintings. The painting is part of Carter's Water Series which explores how the sky reflects on, and how the wind impacts, water.

Water Series #30 was purchased by the Pennsylvania Academy of the Fine Arts in 2004. It is part of the Harold A. and Ann R. Sorgenti Collection of Contemporary African-American Art.
