= Doms (company) =

Indian stationery brand

DOMS Industries Limited
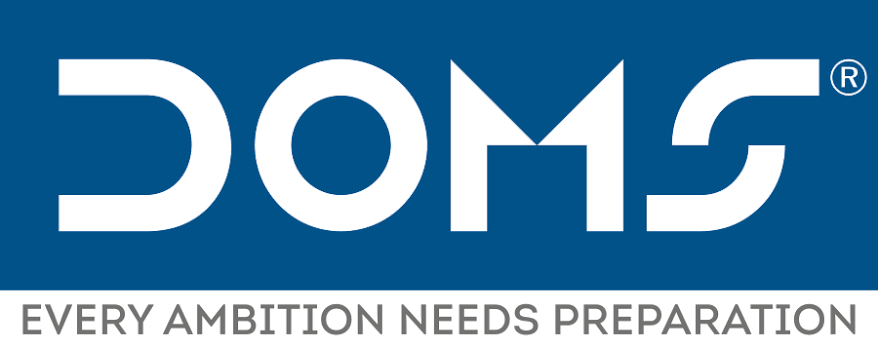
- Trade name: DOMS
- Type: Public
- Traded as: NSE: DOMS; BSE: 544045
- Industry: Stationery
- Founded: 1976; 50 years ago
- Founders: Rasiklal Raveshia; Mansukhlal Rajani
- Headquarters: Gujarat, Hiranandani Link Road, Vikhroli (W), Mumbai – 400079, Maharashtra, India.
- Key people: Gianmatteo Terruzzi (Chairman); Santosh Raveshia (Managing Director)
- Products: Pencils; Crayons; Colour pencils; Marker pens; Erasers
- Brands: C3 Pencils
- Revenue: ▲₹1,212 crore (US$130 million) (FY23)
- Net income: ▲₹95 crore (US$9.9 million) (FY23)
- Owner: FILA Group (31%)
- Website: domsindia.com

DOMS Industries Limited (DIL) (stylized as DOMS) is an Indian stationery and art materials manufacturing company, headquartered in Valsad, Gujarat. It works in a collaboration with multinational Italian company Fila Group.

== History ==
DOMS was founded in 1976 as a partnership firm, R.R. Industries, by Rasiklal Amritlal Raveshia and Mansukhlal Jamnadas Rajani. The company was later named as "Writefine Products Pvt. Ltd.", before being changed to "DOMS Industries". In 2005, the company launched its flagship brand, DOMS. DOMS originally stood for "Dynamic Organization Manufacturing Stationery".

In 2012, DOMS entered into a strategic partnership with F.I.L.A. – Fabbrica Italiana Lapis ed Affini S.p.A (F.I.L.A.), Italy, a listed Italian multinational company engaged in the supply of art materials and stationery products.

DOMS also acquired 30% stake in toy company ClapJoy.

In 2023, DOMS launched its initial public offering (IPO) worth ₹1,200 crore (US$120 million) and listed on BSE and NSE.

== See also ==
- Classmate
