= Anthony Del Col =

Writer

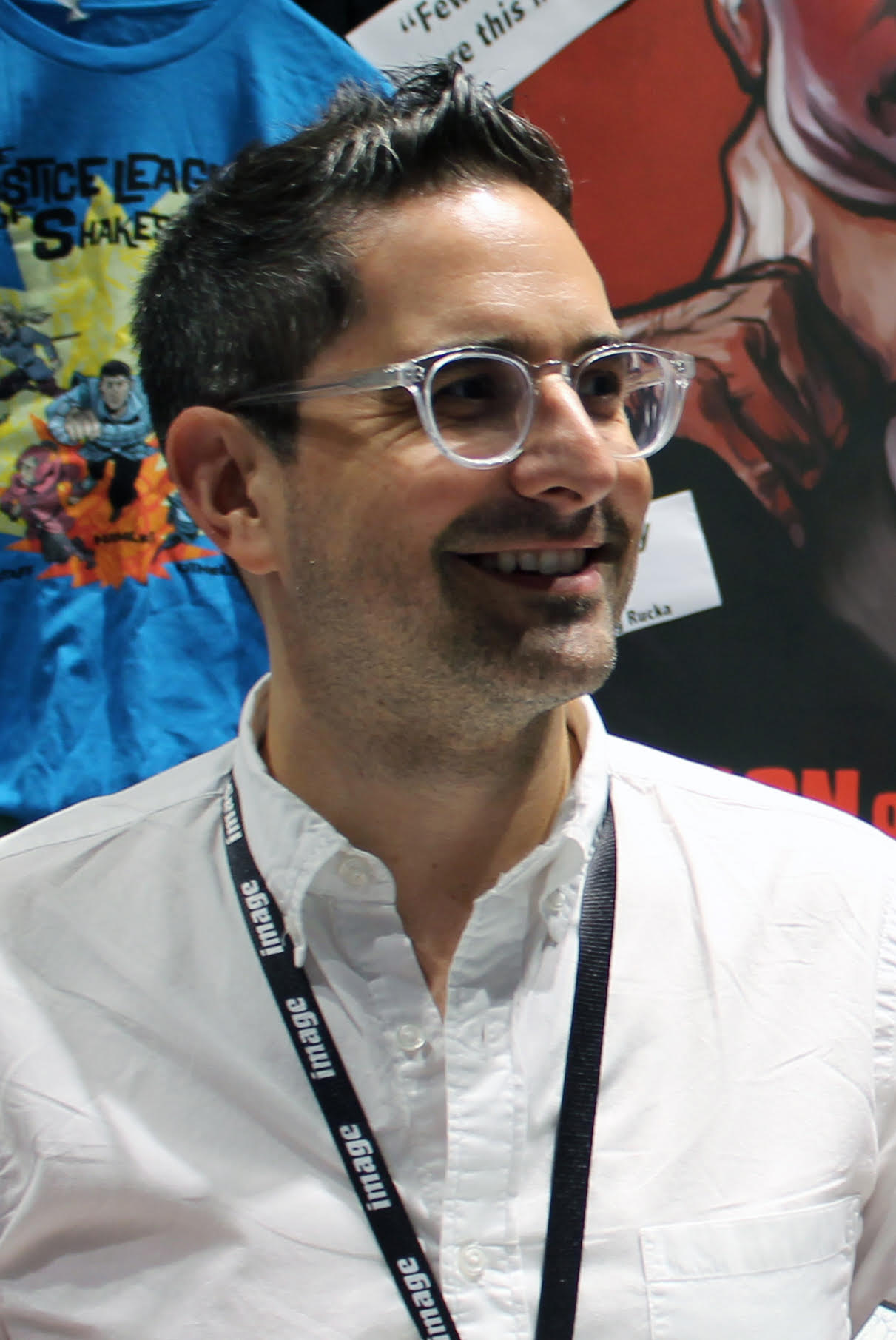
- Del Col at NYCC 2019
- Born: Porcupine, Ontario, Canada
- Education: Wilfrid Laurier University
- Occupation: Writer / Producer
- Known for: I Escaped a Chinese Internment Camp, Son of Hitler, Luke Cage: Everyman, Kill Shakespeare and Assassin's Creed

Anthony Del Col is a Canadian-born, Pulitzer Prize-winning creator, writer and entrepreneur. Del Col is the writer of the Insider comic I Escaped a Chinese Internment Camp, the co-creator and co-writer of the comic and audio series Kill Shakespeare, Audible's Assassin's Creed: Gold (starring Oscar-winner Riz Ahmed), Marvel's Luke Cage: Everyman and the controversial Image Comics graphic novel Son of Hitler.

== Early life ==
Del Col was born and raised in Timmins, Ontario, Canada and is a graduate of Wilfrid Laurier University, the Canadian Film Centre and the Sundance Institute's New Frontier Story Lab,

== Career ==
Del Col has produced feature films in Canada, including serving as executive producer on the Nelly Furtado Loose Live album CD.

Del Col is also an accomplished film pitch consultant; He won the Telefilm Canada Pitch This contest in 2006 and 2010. Anthony also served as a coach for the contest in 2011 and 2012.

Del Col has written for a number of podcasts, including Wondery's hit series Against the Odds, The Association of the United States Army's Army Matters, and BBC Radio 4's Dont Listen To This.

=== Kill Shakespeare ===
Along with Conor McCreery, Del Col is the co-creator and co-writer of Kill Shakespeare, which debuted in comic book format in April 2010. Kill Shakespeare is described by the New York Times as, "gripping, violent and dark fun, even if you're not fully versed in Shakespearean lore". As of 2011, more than 50,000 copies had been sold in more than a dozen countries.

Under Del Col's watch, Kill Shakespeare has been produced in a variety of media. In addition to its publication as a comic book, Del Col and McCreery, along with Soulpepper, have staged a theatrical production of Kill Shakespeare, called "Kill Shakespeare Live!". The theatrical production of Kill Shakespeare has been performed in Toronto by Soulpepper, in Montreal at the 2012 Montreal Comiccon, in Chicago by Strawdog Theatre Company, as well as at MEFCC 2013 in Dubai. Del Col and McCreery are also working with Katie Musgrave, an academic, and Brian Kelly, a teacher, to create a teacher's guide for Kill Shakespeare in an effort to encourage teachers to use Kill Shakespeare as an educational tool. The Kill Shakespeare board game was successfully crowdfunded via Kickstarter and was released on February 19, 2014. Del Col and McCreery have also discussed plans to release a Kill Shakespeare mobile app game. Del Col has also given lectures on comic writing, adapting Shakespeare, and Shakespeare in education. In May 2015, Del Col spoke at Shakespeare's Globe in London as part of the theatre's Shakespeare Inspired special event series.

In 2025, Del Col wrote a continuation of the series with Romeo vs. Juliet: A Kill Shakespeare Adventure. The series, a "Shakespearean Western", was previewed on Free Comic Book Day 2024 and released to rave reviews in April, 2025.

=== Assassin's Creed ===
In 2015, Del Col, along with fellow Kill Shakespeare writer Conor McCreery, was hired by Titan Comics to launch a new comic series based on the successful Assassin's Creed video game franchise. The series was the first to star a female modern-day lead character, Charlotte de la Cruz, and garnered a great amount of positive reviews. Leading comics site TheMarySue.com said, "It's a fantastic video game based title; it really captures a lot of spirit of Assassin's Creed…captures your imagination from the get-go." Del Col and McCreery's series, titled simply Assassin's Creed (or alternatively Assassin's Creed: Assassins), ran for 14 issues from October 2015 to December 2016 and was later collected as three individual volumes.

=== Death of Nancy Drew and surrounding controversy ===
In March 2017, Dynamite Entertainment released Anthony Del Col's reboot of classic characters Nancy Drew and The Hardy Boys with NANCY DREW & THE HARDY BOYS: THE BIG LIE. Del Col has been a lifelong fan of the characters and was successful in working with Simon & Schuster to secure the comic book rights and then pitch to publishers.

Inspired by Archie Comics' Afterlife with Archie, Del Col is quoted as saying, "So, then I started to think, 'Huh, I wonder what other characters are out there that are well-known that could be rebooted like that,'" Del Col said. "That's when I started to look around and I looked in some properties, and then I thought, 'Wait a minute. Nancy Drew. Hardy Boys. Oh, that would be really cool to do a hard-boiled noir take on them.' "

The series finds characters Frank and Joe Hardy accused of murdering their father, Fenton Hardy, and turning to a femme fatale-esque Nancy Drew to clear their names. The series features artwork by Italian artist Werther Dell'Ederra with covers by UK artist Fay Dalton. Del Col credits editors Matt Idelson and Matt Humphreys with helping him shape the direction of the series.

The series debuted to positive reviews. Comics blog Readingwithaflightring.com declared it, "the best 'modern' approach to updating a franchise like this that I've seen. It works on every level and still fully embraces the heart of who they are." Aintitcool.com reviewer Lyz Reblin stated, "The strength of the series thus far is Ms. Drew, who was absent for most of the first issue. She is a pitch-perfect modernized femme fatale, who could hold her own up against any present-day Sam Spade, Philip Marlowe, or the like."

Del Col followed up the series with The Death of Nancy Drew in 2020. The series, with art by Joe Eisma, was announced in early 2020 and immediately received a great deal of coverage. Fans of the character immediately voiced their dissent online, including author Melanie Rehak (Girl Sleuth: Nancy Drew and the Women Who Created Her), stating, "The idea of killing her really flies in the face of her appeal as a character — if they have killed her, which we don’t actually know." The controversy was profiled by CNN, Newsweek, Polygon and other sources.

=== Son of Hitler ===
In 2018, Del Col co-created the Image original graphic novel Son of Hitler with writer Geoff Moore and artist Jeff Mccomsey. Matt O'Keefe of ComicsBeat called it a "page-turning graphic novel", offering "an alternate history story with obvious respect for the actual events of World War 2". Son of Hitler is a noir spy-thriller centering around a conspiracy to take down Hitler in the last days of World War Two. Del Col expressed his personal love for historical fiction, noting his love for the "shadows and blindspots" that populate the area between historical fact and fiction. Son of Hitler brings together many aspects of Del Col's comics work in one volume; it shares the historical elements of Del Col's Kill Shakespeare and Assassin's Creed comics and the classic mysterious noir elements of his Nancy Drew & The Hardy Boys.

=== Luke Cage: Everyman ===
In 2018, Del Col wrote the series Luke Cage: Everyman for Marvel Comics. Jahnoy Lindsay provided the interior art with covers by Declan Shalvey. Everyman was a Marvel Digital Original released as 3 single issues and collected as a trade paperback in November 2019. Reviewers praised it for being "bold" and "political", pitting Luke Cage against a CTE diagnosis as well as villains in his own community. Everyman was called an interesting unconventional look at the Marvel universe, with critics highlighting Del Col's humanizing portrayal of Luke Cage and Lindsay's realistic depiction of Harlem.

=== 2022 Pulitzer Prize ===
On May 8, 2022, Del Col — along with collaborators Fahmida Azim, Josh Adams, and Walter Hickey — were the recipients of the first-ever Pulitzer Prize for Illustrated Reporting and Commentary for their work on "I Escaped a Chinese Internment Camp," published by Insider. The story is a first-person retelling of Zumrat Duwat's experience imprisoned by the Chinese authorities for being a Uyghur Muslim. It was the first Pulitzer for Insider. The victory received some controversy, as the Association of American Editorial Cartoonists subsequently called for the Pulitzers to restore its previous category of Editorial Cartooning.

== Personal life ==
Del Col lives in Brooklyn, New York, with his wife, Lisa, and their children.

== Awards ==
- Del Col won the 2006 and 2010 Telefilm Canada Pitch This! events at the Toronto film festivals.
- In 2011, Del Col and McCreery were nominated for a Joe Shuster Award in the category of Outstanding Comic Book Writer(s), and a Harvey Award for Best New Series.
- In 2021 Del Col was nominated for a Ringo Award for Best Writer for his work on "Totally Under Control" for Insider.
- In 2022 Del Col received the Pulitzer Prize for Illustrated Reporting and Commentary.
- In 2023 Del Col was nominated for a Ringo Award for Best Writer for his work on "88 Days of Hell", "Bulldozer Injustice" and "Offside". His story, "88 Days of Hell" was also nominated for Best Webcomic, Best Non-Fiction Work and Best Single Story.
- In 2025 Del Col was nominated for an Ambie Award for Best Scriptwriting, Fiction for his work on BBC Radio 4's Don't Listen to This.
