= Dixon Ticonderoga =

American pencil manufacturer

Dixon Ticonderoga Company
- Type: Subsidiary
- Industry: Stationery
- Predecessor: Joseph Dixon Crucible Company; Bryn Mawr Corporation
- Founded: 1795; 231 years ago (Note: It takes the date of foundation of the oldest company (Bryn Mawr Corporation).)
- Founder: Joseph Dixon
- Fate: Formed from the merger of Joseph Dixon Crucible Company (1827) with Bryn Mawr Corporation (1795)
- Headquarters: Lake Mary, Florida, U.S.
- Area served: Worldwide
- Key people: Rodrigo Bustillo
- Products: Office and Art Supplies
- Parent: F.I.L.A. SpA
- Website: dixonticonderoga.com

The Dixon Ticonderoga Company (/taɪkɒndəˈroʊɡə/) is an American manufacturer of office and art supplies based in Heathrow, Florida. A subsidiary of Italian-based F.I.L.A. SpA, the company offers a number of brands, with one of the most well-known being Ticonderoga: the yellow No. 2 (HB) pencil known for its distinctive green and yellow ferrule. Other brands include Dixon and Oriole pencils, Dixon Industrial products, Prang school and art supplies, and Lyra and Pacon art products.

== History ==
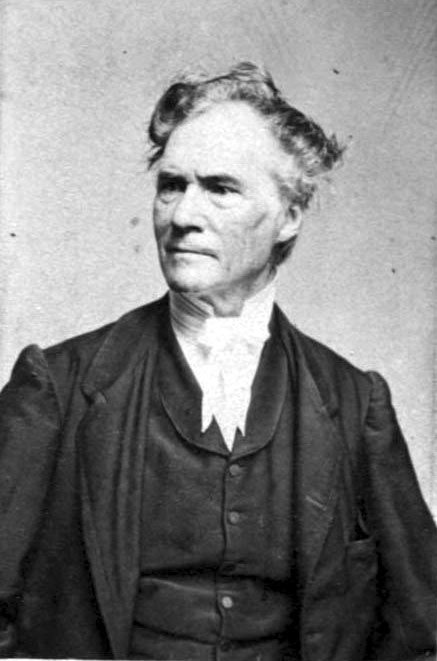
Joseph Dixon, founder

The company was formed by the 1982 merger of Joseph Dixon Crucible Company of New Jersey (founded in 1827) with Bryn Mawr Corporation of Pennsylvania, dating to 1795. The former company was founded by Joseph Dixon and his son. The pencil's name originates in the graphite ore discovered in 1815 on Lead Mountain (sometimes Lead Hill) near Ticonderoga, New York.

In 2002, the company closed down its Sandusky, Ohio, factory, shifting the manufacturing operations to Mexico. In 2005, the company was acquired by F.I.L.A., a manufacturer of school and art supplies based in Milan, Italy, and announced the closure of its main US factory in Versailles, Missouri. The company retains a distribution center in Georgia, where it makes limited numbers of pencils in order to claim status as a domestic producer, and a headquarters facility in Heathrow, Florida. In 2008, Dixon (as part of the F.I.L.A. Group) acquired 200-year-old German-based manufacturer Lyra.

A consultant and former director of business development for the Dixon Ticonderoga company has been Lee Corso (sports broadcaster on ESPN's College Gameday). According to USA Today, his on-air trademark is waving one of the company's No. 2 pencils to punctuate his speech.

The current president and chief executive officer of Dixon Ticonderoga is John Carlberg.

== Ticonderoga pencil ==
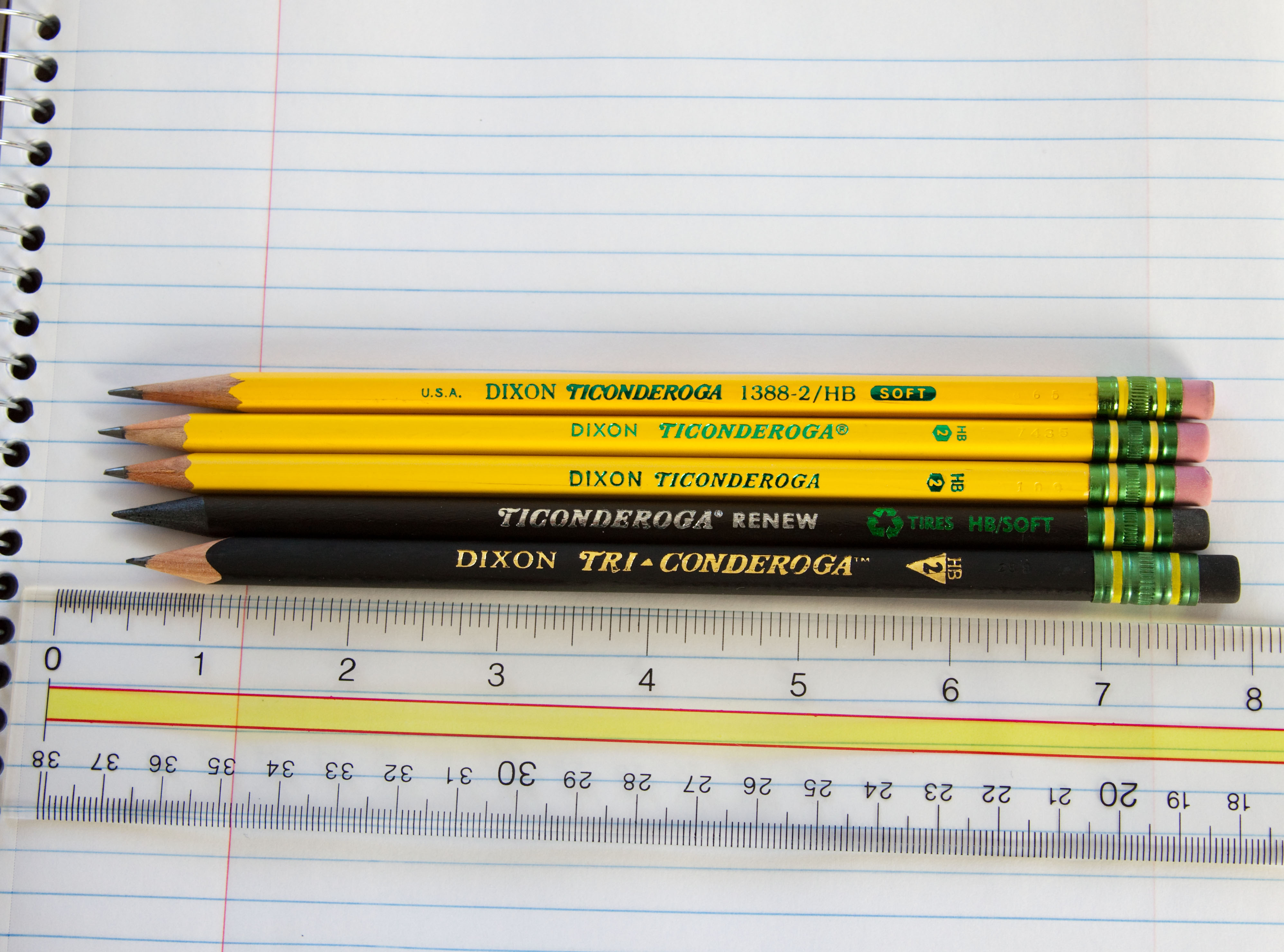
An assortment of pencils manufactured by the Dixon Ticonderoga Company

The classic Ticonderoga is a wood-cased graphite pencil. It is well known for having a characteristic yellow color, a green (originally brass) metallic ferrule, and a soft pink eraser. The pencil has a mild hexagonal shape that slows surface rolling. Its thickness is approximately 7mm, and its unsharpened length is 19 cm. The Ticonderoga was traditionally manufactured from Eastern red cedar, but it is now made from an unspecified American cedar.

The eponymous Ticonderoga model pencil is distributed by the Dixon Ticonderoga Company. The company, which was originally located in downtown Jersey City, New Jersey, was founded in the 19th century. In 1999, Dixon ceased US production of the Ticonderoga pencil, but it continues to own and operate facilities outside the US in Italy, France, Asia, Latin America and Germany.

Dixon Ticonderoga manufactures a variety of pencils, including the Classic, Black, Noir, Tri-Conderoga, Microban, Laddie, My First (formerly Beginners), SenseMatic, and colored pencils. The pencils are available in different grades: #1 (Extra Soft), #2 (Soft), #2½ (Medium), #3 (Hard), and #4 (Extra Hard).

== Brands ==
- Prang
- GoWrite!
- Pacon
- WonderFoam
- KolorFast
- Dixon
- Ticonderoga
- Ghostline
- Princeton Artist Brush
