= Joseph Dixon (inventor) =

American inventor (1799–1869)

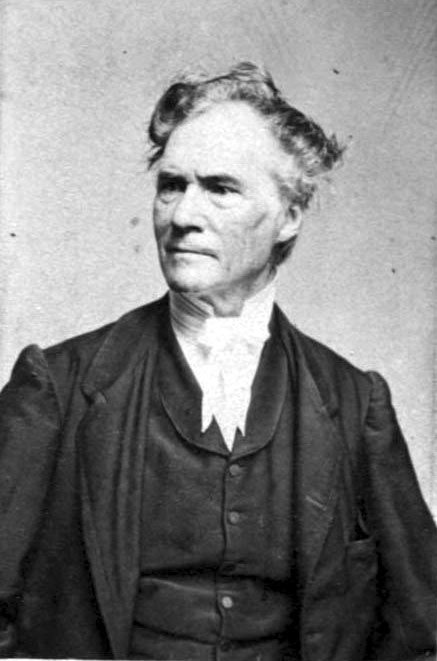
- Born: January 1, 1799; Salem, Massachusetts, U.S.
- Died: June 15, 1869 (aged 70); Jersey City, New Jersey, U.S.
- Occupations: Inventor, entrepreneur
- Known for: Founder of the Dixon Ticonderoga Company
- Notable work: Dixon Ticonderoga pencil

Joseph Dixon (1 January 1799 – 15 June 1869) was an inventor, entrepreneur and the founder of what became the Dixon Ticonderoga Company, a well-known manufacturer of pencils in the United States.

His fascination with new technologies led to many innovations such as a mirror for a camera that was the forerunner of the viewfinder, a patented double-crank steam engine, and a method of printing banknotes to thwart counterfeiters. Most notably, Dixon manufactured the first wood and graphite pencil in the country.

Among his associates were such American inventors as Robert Fulton, Samuel Morse, and Alexander Graham Bell, and politician/business partner Orestes Cleveland.

== Joseph Dixon Crucible Company ==
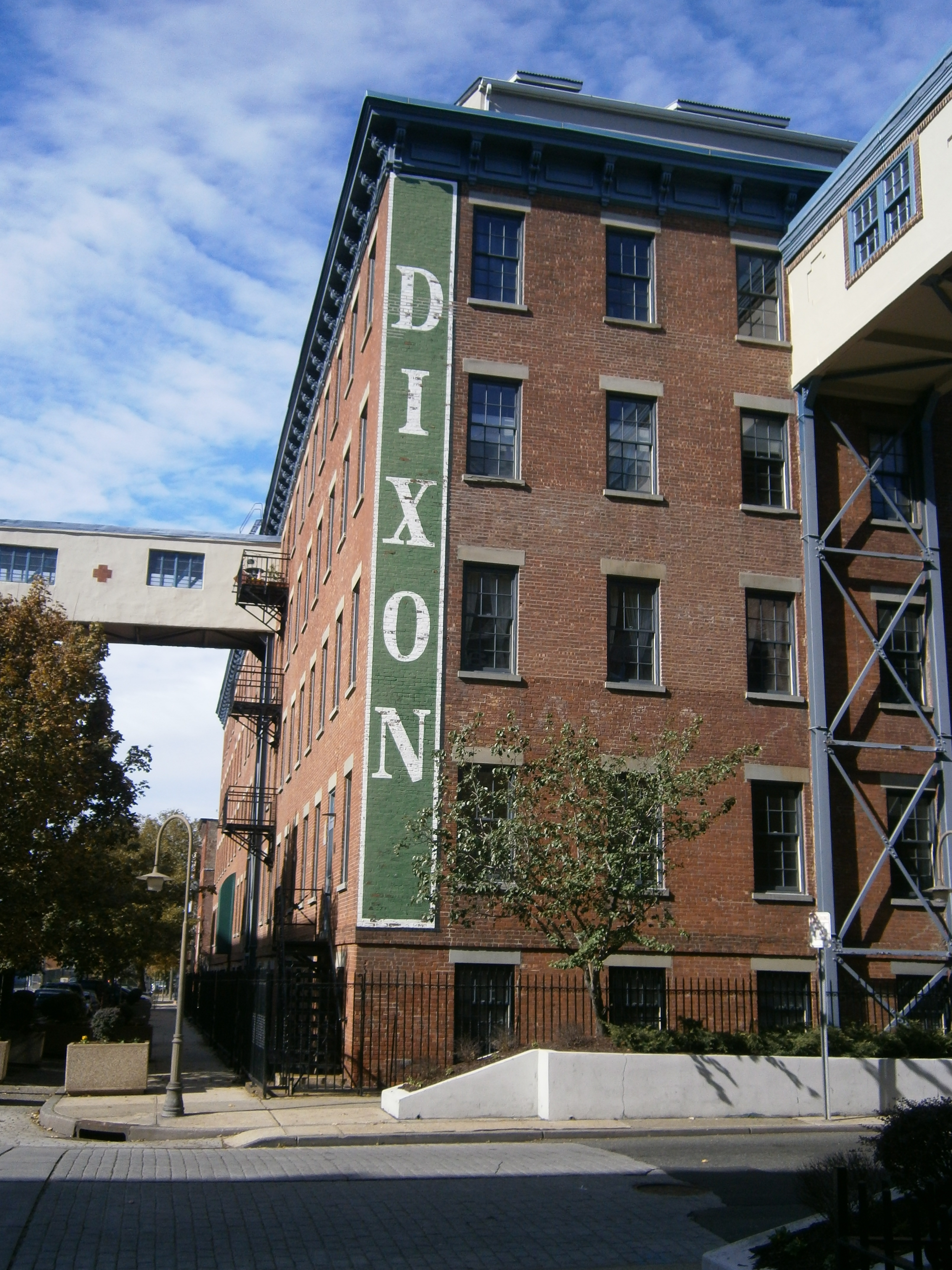
Dixon Mills in Jersey City has become a residential complex

In 1827, Joseph Dixon began his business in Salem, Massachusetts and, with his son, was involved with the Tantiusques graphite mine in Sturbridge, Massachusetts. Dixon discovered the merits of graphite as a stove polish and an additive in lubricants, foundry facings, brake linings, oil-less bearings, and non-corrosive paints.

He also refined the use of graphite crucibles, refractory vessels used for melting metallic minerals. A heat-resistant graphite crucible he invented was widely used in the production of iron and steel during the Mexican–American War. This invention's success led Dixon to build a new mill in what is now the Van Vorst Park neighborhood of historic Downtown Jersey City, New Jersey in 1847. The Dixon Mills complex has subsequently become residences.

During the 1860s, people typically wrote with quill pens and ink even though Dixon introduced graphite pencils in 1829. But the American Civil War created a demand for a dry, clean, portable writing instrument and led to the mass production of pencils. At the time of Dixon's death in 1869, the Joseph Dixon Crucible Company was the largest manufacturer of graphite products in the world. By 1870, The Joseph Dixon Crucible Company was the world's largest dealer and consumer of graphite. By 1872 the Dixon company was making 86,000 pencils a day.

The Joseph Dixon Crucible Company continued to prosper throughout the 20th century by growing through a series of mergers and acquisitions. In 1982, the Joseph Dixon Crucible Company merged with the Bryn Mawr Corporation, a Pennsylvania transportation and real estate company with operations dating back to 1795. Together, these companies formed the Dixon Ticonderoga Company, named after Dixon and its oldest brand-name pencil.
