= Menna van Praag =

English novelist and screenwriter

- Born: Cambridge, England
- Education: Balliol College, Oxford
- Occupations: Novelist and writing educator
- Writing career
- Language: English
- Genre: Magical realism
- Notable works: The House at the End of Hope Street (2013); The Dress Shop of Dreams (2014); The Witches of Cambridge (2016); The Sisters Grimm trilogy (2020 - 2023)
- Website: www.mennavanpraag.com

Menna van Praag is an English novelist and writing educator. Her magical realism novels include The House at the End of Hope Street (2013), The Dress Shop of Dreams (2014), and The Sisters Grimm trilogy (2020 - 2023).

== Biography ==
Menna van Praag was born in Cambridge and studied modern history at Balliol College, Oxford. She worked as a waitress for a decade before becoming a writer, and was a script reader and editor for BBC Film and BBC Television. She teaches at the University of Cambridge Institute of Continuing Education and in the Creative Writing program at Anglia Ruskin University.

She has cited magical realism as her favorite genre and Alice Hoffman, Isabelle Allende, Laura Esquivel, Sarah Addison Allen, and Barbara O'Neal as favorite authors in that genre. Her novella, a fable, Men, Money and Chocolate (2009) has been translated into 26 languages.

Her novel, The House at the End of Hope Street was published in 2013. Her next novel, The Dress Shop of Dreams, was published in 2014. Her next novel, The Witches of Cambridge was published in 2016. She then published the novel The Sisters Grimm in 2020, which was the first book in a trilogy.

From 2022 through 2023 she was a Royal Literary Fund Fellow.

=== The House at the End of Hope Street ===
In a review for The Daily News Journal, Sandee Suitt praised the inclusion of Elizabeth Garrett Anderson, Millicent Garrett Fawcett, Agatha Christie, Marian Evans, Virginia Woolf, and Dorothy Parker as characters in the novel, stating, "readers who enjoy a touch of magic in their stories are sure to be delighted" and describing the book as "a whimsical, delightful novel that celebrates women, books and families in all their various forms." Kirkus Reviews noted the inclusion of Daphne du Maurier and Caroline Herschel in addition to Parker, stating the novel "delights with deft writing and charming characters."

In the Times Record News, a review by Sharon Galligar Chance also noted the inclusion of Florence Nightingale and Elizabeth Taylor, and praised the pace of the plot as well as the development of the characters "both past and present." In a review for Booklist, Cortney Ophoff wrote, "Even through the sometimes dark landscape of loss and abuse, van Praag's writing is bright and hopeful" and "Fans of Jasper Fforde, Gloria Naylor, or Sarah Addison Allen will especially appreciate this story as a celebration of feminine strength and accomplished women through the ages."

=== The Dress Shop of Dreams ===
In a review for Booklist, Cortney Ophoff described the novel as "a delightful blending of many love stories plus a tale of murder and suspense" and wrote, "Van Praag has a knack for balancing a large cast of engaging characters, and her references to beloved authors and historic scientists are enjoyable touchstones between doses of mystery and magic." According to a review for Library Journal by Brooke Bolton, "Even the least cynical will find the constant reminder that love will either conquer all or find a way a bit too saccharine." Kirkus Reviews stated, "A few too many secrets and a murder-mystery plotline that feels like a bit of an afterthought can't mar this brightly colored fabulist confection, more sweet than filling but still sure to delight those looking for a little fairy dust in their romance."

=== The Sisters Grimm trilogy ===
In a review for Booklist, Leah von Essen described the "core" of The Sisters Grimm as "a story determined to exalt the powers of the feminine and of sisterhood: [van Praag] paints the lives of four young, independent, and determined women, and their coming-of-age tales, rather than the magic itself, are what guide and shape this novel." A review by Kristi Chadwick in Library Journal stated, "Ethereal prose sets up a nefarious fairy tale-inspired story about the balance of power between men and women, family ties and first loves, and the choices that must be made whether you are ready or not." A review by Eric Brown in The Guardian described the novel as "a compelling, intensely poetic narrative of empowerment and self-realisation."

A review of The Sisters Grimm in Publishers Weekly stated "Through entrancing prose, van Praag spins a tale of sisterhood and female empowerment, though her message is slightly undermined by the inexplicable ease with which the sisters are duped by the deceitful men in their lives, from their father to their manipulative boyfriends", while also praising the characters as "well-developed" and appealing to readers. According to Kirkus Reviews, van Praag should "receive high marks" for worldbuilding, but the review criticised a lack of sufficient character development, and stated, "while it's admirable that van Praag tackles themes of surviving child abuse, violence, and sexual assault, along with caring for grandparents and parents with mental illnesses, they sadly often get lost in the meandering narrative." A review by Matthew Adams in The Observer concluded, "It is refreshing that Van Praag attempts to examine the traumatic histories (bereavement, abuse and feelings of alienation) of her characters with great determination. But the book's structural and stylistic infelicities stand as an obstacle to any real emotional resolution."

A review of the sequel, Night of Demons and Saints, in Library Journal by Carleigh Obrochta stated, "this second volume has a faster pace and is easier to follow than the first book, which featured five perspectives. But even with this narrowing, the cast of characters in this series is wonderfully varied, with several races and sexualities portrayed," and predicted the novel would appeal to fans of the first book. A Publishers Weekly review stated "The conflict is disappointingly easy for the sisters to dispel, and, despite the low stakes, the story often feels rushed. Still, the complex sibling dynamic keeps the pages turning." A review of the final novel in the trilogy, Child Of Earth And Sky, by Clement Yong in The Straits Times, described the novel as "a pretty but flat affair, with too little magic and an enigmatically written finale that eschews violence for a vague sense of transfiguration."

== Personal life ==
Van Praag resides in Cambridge with her two children and partner.
