= Kill Shakespeare =

2010 limited run comic book series

- Alternative cover for issue #1, designed by Kagan McLeod.

Publication information
- Publisher: IDW Publishing
- Format: Ongoing series
- Publication date: April 2010 – October 2014
- No. of issues: 21 (As of October 2014)
- Main character(s): Hamlet; Juliet; Falstaff; Richard III; Lady Macbeth; Iago; Othello; Romeo

Creative team
- Written by: Anthony Del Col; Conor McCreery
- Artist(s): Andy Belanger; Ian Herring; Kagan McLeod

Collected editions
- Volume 1: A Sea of Troubles: ISBN 1600107818
- Volume 2: The Blast of War: ISBN 1613770251
- Volume 3: The Tide of Blood: ISBN 1613777329
- Volume 4: The Mask of Night: ISBN 1631400584
- The Complete Edition: ISBN 1613771304
- Backstage Edition: ISBN 1613778511

Kill Shakespeare is a twelve-issue comic book limited series released by IDW Publishing. It was produced by Anthony Del Col and Conor McCreery, who also served as co-writers, with Andy Belanger as artist, Ian Herring as colourist, and Kagan McLeod as cover artist. The first issue was published on April 14, 2010.

A second series, the five-issue The Tide of Blood, was released in 2013. A third series, The Mask of Night, was released in 2015. The latest series, Past is Prologue: Juliet, which serves as a prequel to the main series, was released in October 2017.

== Publication history ==
The idea first came to Del Col and McCreery in 2005; however due to other commitments, the project was put on hiatus. The creators considered several mediums for Kill Shakespeare, including video game or movie, but ultimately decided on a comic. In 2009, the pair attended the New York Comic-Con and sparked interest in publishing companies, from whom they eventually chose IDW.

Kill Shakespeare #1 was released on April 14, 2010, and began the series' first story arc. The first story arc ran for a total of 12 issues, and concluded on August 24, 2011.

On November 9, 2010 IDW released a collected edition of issues #1–6 called, Kill Shakespeare Volume 1: A Sea of Troubles. The second collected edition of the Kill Shakespeare series, Kill Shakespeare Volume 2: The Blast of War, was released on November 22, 2011.

On October 11, 2012, IDW announced Kill Shakespeare's return in a new, five-issue, limited series titled, The Tide of Blood, which continued the story of the first series. The first issue of The Tide of Blood, was released on February 20, 2013.

On February 10, 2014, IDW revealed that a third series of Kill Shakespeare would be released. The Mask of Night was a four-issue limited series that picked up almost immediately after the end of the previous series, The Tide of Blood. The first issue of The Mask of Night was released on June 25, 2014.

On May 26, 2015, IDW announced that the first two books in the Kill Shakespeare collection would be collected as a deluxe hardcover. The Backstage Edition would also be fully annotated with contributions from Shakespearean scholars across North America and Europe.

After a two-year hiatus, IDW announced that Kill Shakespeare was returning to comic-stores in 2017. Past is Prologue: Juliet would be a four-issue mini-series that would jump back in the series' history and focus on Juliet's journey from a self-destructive young woman, to one who would one-day lead the rebellion of the first two books. The first issue of Past is Prologue: Juliet was released on April 5, 2017. It featured a new artist, Corin Howell, as well as two colourists – Shari Chankahamma (who had worked on the 3rd and 4th books in the series), and newcomer, Alex Lillie. Due to health concerns with Howell's Father, the series was delayed – with the final issue coming out August 30, 2017.

== Plot synopsis ==
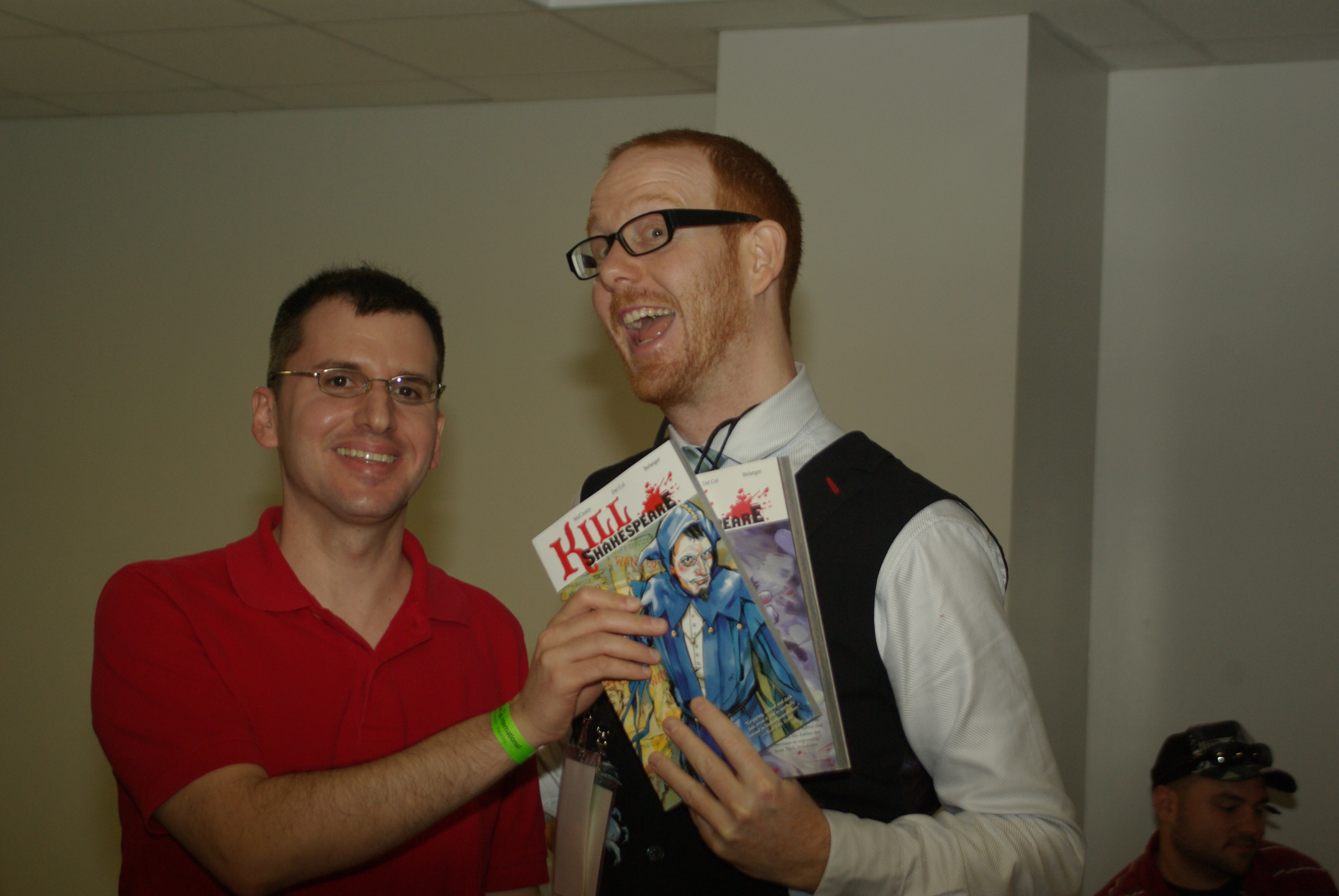
McCreery (right) with a reader at the Miami Book Fair International, 2011

Prince Hamlet is being banished with Rosencrantz and Guildenstern from his country of Denmark for the murder of Polonius. Before he leaves he takes one last look around his city and is confronted by a strange mist that tells him he should kill his uncle. Hamlet then denies that he's a killer and gets onto the ship headed for England. That night Hamlet has another encounter with the mist; the ship is then attacked by pirates. Rosencrantz and Guildenstern are killed, but Hamlet manages to escape on a piece of the ship with a deceased sailor already on it. Hamlet then wakes up in a strange bedroom and meets Richard the Third. Richard tours Hamlet through his city, showing him that he is building libraries and schools for them. He then asks Hamlet if he will help steal Shakespeare's quill because he is the only one who can find Shakespeare; in exchange, Richard will resurrect Hamlet's father. Richard then demonstrates this by bringing the sailor that Hamlet was found with back to life. Hamlet agrees to join Richard's quest to find Shakespeare. Hamlet doesn't know how to find Shakespeare. Then, Iago asks him if he could just relax, and this causes a path to appear in the woods. Richard's party go down the path and find themselves in a small village where they are attacked by a group called Prodigals. Richard hands him a knife to protect himself. That night Hamlet is almost killed by bandits but is saved by Falstaff, who knocks him out and kidnaps him. Iago is sent to find Hamlet. Hamlets wakes up and Falstaff says he was trying to protect Hamlet from people trying to kill him. Hamlet tries to escape by creating another path, but can't. Falstaff offers to take him to a safer place through the woods. While they travel through the woods, they meet Puck; Falstaff then reveals that he's a Prodigal. Hamlet tries to get away from Falstaff, but instead Falstaff takes him to a brothel. The bandits attack the brothel, and Hamlet and Falstaff escape dressed as women. At the same time, Richard is attempting to create an alliance with Macbeth. Lady Macbeth kills her husband because she's in league with Richard.

Hamlet and Falstaff meet up with Juliet Capulet and Othello, the leaders of the Prodigal Rebellion. Falstaff tells them that Hamlet is the "Shadow King" but they don't believe it. Richard's army attacks, Hamlet saves Juliet's life and then Iago saves both of them by attacking Tamora Andronicus, one of the bandits. Othello tries to kill Iago but Iago manages to talk him down. Hamlet tries to leave with Iago, but Juliet won't let him do that, so she decides to make him her captive. Hamlet tries to escape with Iago late at night but Juliet catches them and Iago tells Hamlet to go by himself. Hamlet then meets with his father's ghost who turns into Polonius and then into Hamlet. Hamlet escapes and sees some of Richard's army torturing a group of Prodigals for information. Hamlet is found by Lysander, Demetrius and Adriana, who want to join with Juliet's rebellion. Juliet, Othello, Iago and Falstaff meet up with Hamlet in a barn and they work on Adriana's farm for payment for hospitality. Later, they hold a meeting with several Prodigals and the rebellion begins. Then, Richard's army attacks and the rebellion protects Juliet. Juliet begins to believe Hamlet is the Shadow King, and Iago decides to join the rebellion. Later, Iago meets up with Lady Macbeth and they begin to conspire.

A troupe of actors led by Feste, arrive in the camp of the Prodigal Rebellion and put on a production of The Murder of Gonzago, with Hamlet on stage. Hamlet is reminded of his father's murder and flees. Juliet chases him and they each relate their own personal tragedies, Hamlet's murder of Polonius and Juliet losing Romeo. Hamlet, Iago and Falstaff get ready to begin the search for Shakespeare. The night before they leave Juliet meets with Hamlet and they kiss. The next day they begin the journey, but they are stopped by a group of Paladins led by Romeo Montague. Hamlet uses his power to part the trees and shows the way to The Globe Woods where Shakespeare lives. Hamlet goes in by himself and comes across Puck. Puck leads him to a house on the other side of a river. Hamlet tries to swim the river but then gets pulled down into the water by creatures made up of manuscript pages. At the same time, Iago contacts Lady Macbeth and tells her that Hamlet was killed, but he's discovered by Falstaff. They start to torture Iago to find out what he knows, Iago tells them that Hamlet will kill Shakespeare and not survive his meeting with Shakespeare. Hamlet manages to escape the monsters and finally meets Shakespeare, who seems uninterested in doing anything with the Prodigals or Hamlet. Hamlet throws aside his knife, which then begins to move by itself and then tries to kill Shakespeare.

== Characters ==
=== Hamlet ===
After his Father the King is murdered by Hamlet's Uncle the young Dane vowed revenge. However, after killing family friend Polonius with a blow meant for his Uncle, The Prince questions his thirst for vengeance and flees Denmark. Still haunted by his father's ghost, confused and distraught, Hamlet is now caught up in a destiny far greater than he could have ever imagined.

=== Richard III ===
One of the most powerful and shrewd generals in the land, Richard oversees a growing nation built on the backs of his serfs. Along with his desire to create a legacy through the glorification of his name Richard seeks to crush all opposition and conquer further kingdoms. He has formed a temporary alliance with Lady Macbeth after her betrayal of her husband, but can he trust her?

=== Lady Macbeth ===
Beautiful and ruthless, Lady Macbeth has an unmatched thirst for power. Using her sexuality—and three witches as her council—she subtly steered her husband's rise to prominence. But with Lord Macbeth locked in a battle with Richard III the time was ripe for the Lady to step out of her husband's shadow. She drugged her husband's mead and walled him up in his Cawdor castle. However, will her own ambition lead her to discard Richard in his turn—and can she trust him not to betray her?

=== Iago ===
After fleeing from Othello's side Iago quickly attached himself to Richard III. Using wits and treachery the Spaniard efficiently moved up the ranks and is now one of Richard's most relied-upon deputies. But the corrupt influencer continues to play the odds, a charlatan who can easily change his allegiances—and does.

=== Falstaff ===
A wonderful pain-in-the-ass, Falstaff is quick with both the jab and the jibe. While he plays the quintessential fool he possesses more wisdom and heart than most. A man of faith, Falstaff is unshakeable in his belief in Shakespeare as Creator.

=== Othello ===
After he was unable to kill Iago in vengeance for Desdemona's death, Othello became a hired mercenary, but now leads the Prodigals resistance movement at the side of Juliet. He still hungers for revenge against his old adversary Iago, but has restrained himself thus far.

=== Juliet ===
Her Capulet relatives spirited her away from Verona after she survived her attempted suicide. Witnessing injustice and oppression, and believing her 'lost love' Romeo is dead, she assumes the role of Prodigals resistance movement co-leader, and proves herself a courageous warrior.

=== Romeo ===
However, unknown to Juliet, Romeo has also survived his own attempted suicide, back in Verona, and attempts to make amends by joining the Knights Paladin, who seek to aid the Prodigals resistance to Richard III and Lady Macbeth. Hamlet knows who Romeo is, but he has not yet told him that his former love is also still alive.

=== Incidental characters ===
Rosencrantz and Guildenstern (Hamlet), Puck, Demetrius and Lysander (A Midsummer Night's Dream) and Tamora and Titus Andronicus are featured as either bandits or mercenaries of uncertain affiliation. Furthermore, Mistress Page and Mistress Ford now run a brothel and are eager to renew their acquaintance with their old friend Falstaff. In Issue # 7, the travelling players enact The Murder of Gonzago, the same mise en abyme play used to provoke King Claudius into disclosing his guilt over the murder of Hamlet's father in Hamlet.

== Enchanted objects ==
=== Shakespeare's quill ===
This quill gives the user the ability to change reality. Most of the characters want the quill for themselves. It is unknown what it looks like or if it really is a quill.

=== The dagger ===
In ancient Rome, the dagger was given by Hecate to Brutus to kill Caesar with. The Dagger is first used by Lady Macbeth in the raising of a sailor. Richard then gives the dagger to Hamlet. Later, it turns out that the dagger can move by itself and also lets Lady Macbeth see through its reflection. The Dagger then tries to kill Shakespeare while Hamlet is talking to him.

== Collected editions ==
#	Title	ISBN	Release date	Collected material
1	Kill Shakespeare Volume 1: A Sea of Troubles	ISBN 1-60010-781-8	November 9, 2010	Kill Shakespeare #1–6
2	Kill Shakespeare Volume 2: The Blast of War	ISBN 1-61377-025-1	November 22, 2011	Kill Shakespeare #6–12
3	Kill Shakespeare Volume 3: The Tide of Blood	ISBN 1-61377-732-9	October 1, 2013	Kill Shakespeare: The Tide of Blood #1–5
4	Kill Shakespeare Volume 4: The Mask of Night	ISBN 1-63140-058-4	December 25, 2014	Kill Shakespeare: The Mask of Night #1–4
	Kill Shakespeare: The Complete Edition	ISBN 1-61377-130-4	January 7, 2014	Kill Shakespeare #1–12
	Kill Shakespeare: Backstage Edition	ISBN 1-61377-851-1	June 4, 2015	Kill Shakespeare #1–12 with a leather hard cover, annotations by some of the top Shakespeare scholars in North America, an original Kill Shakespeare story, and original artwork designed by Andy Belanger.

== Reception ==
Shakespearean actor and writer of Shakespeare on Toast Ben Crystal opined that the comic was "beautifully drawn", elaborating that it "reminds me of Hellboy, particularly the ghosts and witches. It looks great, has a good pace, and is exciting to read." Crystal offers room for improvement, "The language is a bit of a tricky one. For the most part, it works well. There's an error here and there... but those aside, I think it falters when the writer tries to attempt a mock-Shakespearean style." George Gene Gustine of The New York Times called the series "gripping, violent and dark fun, even if you're not fully versed in Shakespearean lore", while Fangoria called it "a highly enjoyable adventure," saying that "McCreery and Del Col skillfully juggle a Who's Who assortment of characters, and Belanger places them in stylishly imagined backdrops on every page".

Shakespearean scholar Kimberly Cox, partner of well-known comic creator Frank Miller, criticized the book, primarily taking issue with its non-adherence to Shakespeare's well-known iambic pentameter style, stating, "Under duress and under a deadline, I can write exactly in the same meter and syntax as the Bard. It's not so difficult once you study enough of the text". Cox also noted that the comic is "so poorly done, so flawed on even the most elementary levels of story-telling".

== Awards ==
- In 2011, Del Col and McCreery were nominated for a Joe Shuster Award in the category of Outstanding Comic Book Writer(s), and a Harvey Award for Best New Series, both for their work on Kill Shakespeare.

== Adaptation ==
The first twelve issues of Kill Shakespeare were adapted into a live staged reading format in 2011 by Del Col, McCreery, and dramaturg Toby Malone at Soulpepper Theatre Company in Toronto. The first full-length showing was part of 'The Word Festival,' which in 2011 focused on the works of Shakespeare. The success of this production led to further development and showings at comic-book conventions in Montreal, New York, and Halifax; as well, general-audience performances have been produced in Halifax and Tucson. A new production of the show was staged in the Sam Wanamaker Playhouse for Shakespeare's Globe on 27 July 2018, directed by James Wallace and James Askill.

== Board game ==
In October 2013, Kill Shakespeare announced that a board game adaptation of the first series, would be released in 2014. The game was designed and produced in collaboration with IDW Games and Pandasaurus Games. The game features artwork from Glenn Fabry and J. K. Woodward. The project was successfully crowdfunded on Kickstarter, and achieved its first stretch goal which resulted in a map-upgrade. On December 10, 2014, the game was officially launched at Snakes & Lattes in Toronto.

IDW Games defines the gameplay as "semi-cooperative" which differs from traditional cooperative board-game, in that, though players work together to win the game, they are also competing against one another to gain the most points by the end of the game:

"Players will need to work together to devote their resources to prevent Lady Macbeth and King Richard from either taking over the land or capturing the elusive bard, William Shakespeare. At the same time, they'll need to hold back enough of their resource pool in order to complete their own quests so that their banner reigns supreme when the game ends."

Nate Murray, of IDW Games, expands on the mechanics of the game:

"Kill Shakespeare is an area control and influence game set in a world populated by all of Shakespeare's most popular characters. Players can play as either Hamlet, Juliet, Falstaff, Othello or Viola. It's a semi-cooperative game pitting the players against the forces of King Richard and Lady Macbeth. There can only be one winner in the end, but if the players don't work together, they can all lose."

According to IGN, Kill Shakespeare: The Board Game is further notable as it is the first time a comic book publisher produced a board game through crowdfunding.
