= Arches paper =

Paper brand

Arches paper is a brand of air-dried paper that is used by printers and watercolorists. It has a warm white colour and is produced in hot-pressed, cold-pressed, and rough varieties. Arches paper is made in the village of Arches in the Vosges, France.

== History ==
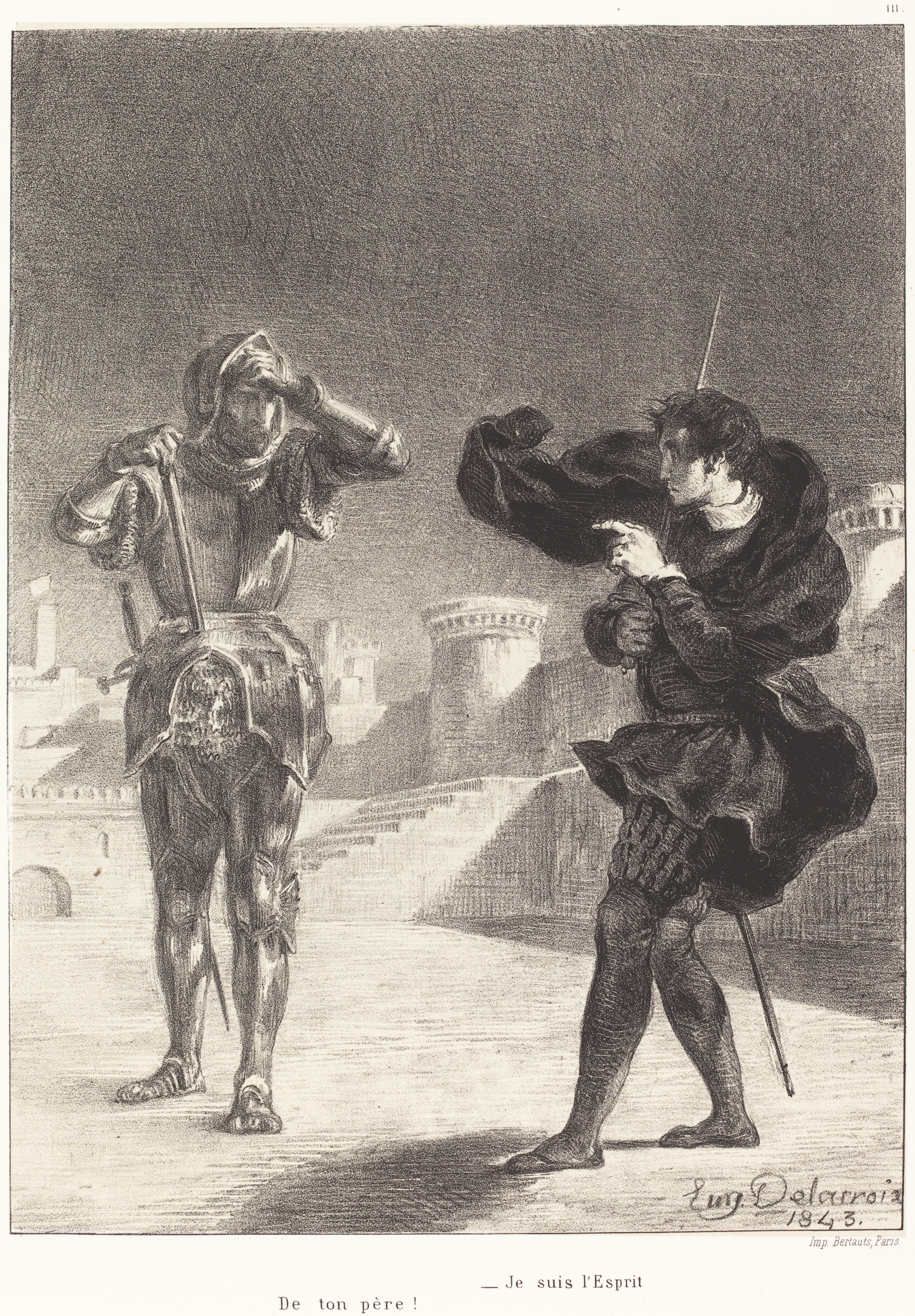
The Phantom on the Terrace, Hamlet (1843) by Eugène Delacroix, a lithograph on Arches wove paper

The history of Arches starts in 1492 when the Arches site completed the amalgamation of the paper-making facilities around the village of Arches, south of Epinal.

The Moulins d'Arches turned to the production of high quality paper for writing and art publication. The mill thus produced paper for incunables (the name given to the first printed books), such as the Nuremberg Chronicle. Also printed on Arches paper was the Description de l'Égypte commissioned by Napoleon I upon his return from his Egyptian campaign, and the complete works of Voltaire, a printing project that consumed some 70 tons of handmade Arches paper. By the end of the 19th century Arches had industrialized and focused its production on papers for banknotes, watercolor, and art books.

The 1922 first edition of James Joyce's Ulysses was printed on a variety of papers. One hundred and fifty of these thousand copies were printed and numbered to a larger size now known as the 'Giant Joyce', on vergé d’Arches paper.

Notable works of 20th-century art were produced on Arches paper, including etchings by Henri Matisse and lithographs by Pablo Picasso. Salvador Dalí produced prints on the paper; the Arches watermark is a point used to evaluate the authenticity of some of his prints.

Today Arches produces papers for painting, drawing, writing, art printing, art publishing, and photographic conservation.

== See also ==
- Cartridge paper
