= Greenpoint Renaissance Enterprise Corporation =

Community organization

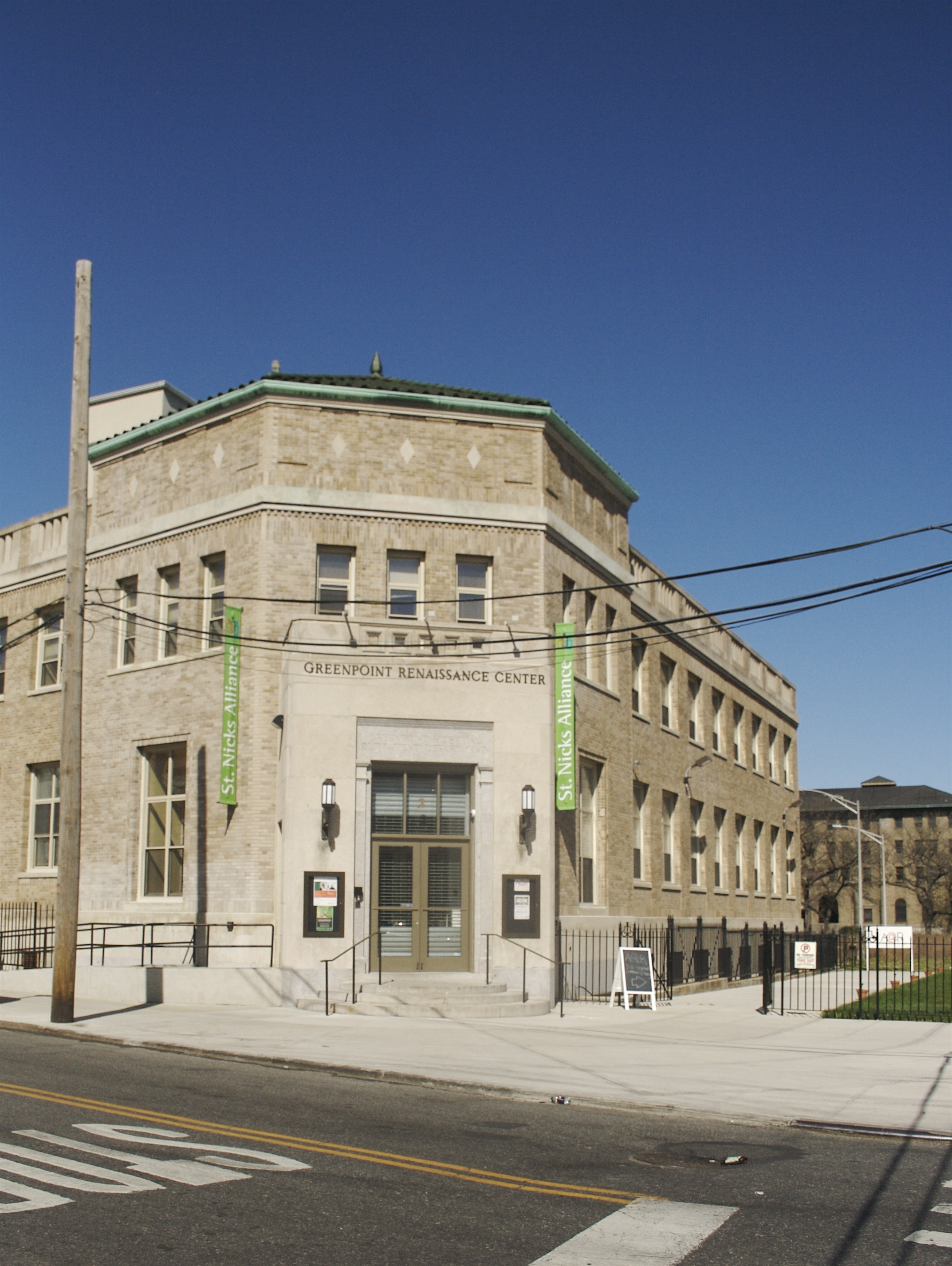
- St. Nick's Renaissance Center, head administrative building of the GREC

General information
- Status: intact
- Type: Hospital
- Location: Brooklyn, New York City, USA

The Greenpoint Renaissance Enterprise Corporation (GREC) is a consortium of neighborhood organizations in North Brooklyn that serves to facilitate and advocate the activities for city initiatives, as well as coordinate community involvement in the neighborhood of the former Greenpoint Hospital Complex.

== Mission ==
GREC's mission is to bring together community residents through collective institutions and to put forth proactive initiatives, suggesting what the city government of New York could be doing to make the neighborhood better for all of the residents. This includes planning the physical space in the neighborhood in order to make it into a place where people can have a decent quality of life in a safe environment. The consortium initially came together to coordinate community involvement around the redevelopment of the former Greenpoint Hospital Complex after the city closed the facility, preparing a comprehensive plan with the Williamsburg/Greenpoint community that reflects the broad community consensus on the reuse of the campus. The plan was adopted by Brooklyn Community Board 1 as the "Community Plan," and supported by all elected officials.

The community vision seeks to utilize this public resource to create a broad range of health, residence, and community services to meet the current and future needs of residents in Greenpoint and Williamsburg, as well as greater North Brooklyn.

== History ==
Greenpoint Hospital was shut down by the City of New York in the winter of 1982. Once the heartbeat of community health services, the hospital represented an anchor institution of the Greenpoint/Williamsburg community. Neighborhood residents and leaders responded by forming the Greenpoint Hospital Task Force in a cooperative effort to help protect the vacant property and develop a comprehensive plan for its reuse.

In 1983 the New York City government began to move homeless men from various parts of the city into the vacant buildings of Greenpoint Hospital without the knowledge or approval of the local community. The number of men rose quickly, reaching a peak of over 1,100 men by 1984. The men were offered (virtually) no support services other than housing and were turned out into the street each day. The local crime rate increased drastically; “men who badly needed support to get back on their feet were often found living in hovels throughout the community, stripping homes of aluminum and otherwise engaged in a broad array of antisocial and criminal activities. New York City’s decision to reuse the facility as a homeless shelter without local consultation and with complete indifference to its impact on community life enraged local residents." As a result, led by community leaders Tish and Guido Cianciotta and the Concerned Citizens of Withers Street and Area Block Association, residents spent 140 nights in a vigil outside the complex to draw attention to the combined injustice to homeless men and the host community.

In 1984, following New York City's release of a Request for Proposal (RFP) to redevelop the overall campus of the hospital, community members formed the Greenpoint Renaissance Enterprise Corporation (GREC). GREC is a consortium of six local and community organizations including Neighborhood Women of Williamsburg/Greenpoint, Concerned Citizens of Withers Street and Area Block Association, St. Nicks Alliance, North Brooklyn Federal Credit Union, Cooper Park Houses Resident Council, and Conselyea Street Block Association. These diverse organizations came together transcending race, income, and religion to focus on a consensus community plan. GREC planned an adaptive reuse project for the Greenpoint Hospital Complex that would address a broad range of housing and healthcare problems facing the community. Unfortunately however, while the RFP seemed to be a step in the right direction, New York City was simultaneously “aggressively turning Greenpoint Hospital into the largest men’s homeless shelter in the United States.”

GREC developed a broad vision for the complex and forged ahead with the support of City Hall (following a $5,000 good faith deposit) to attempt to finance the project. In 1986 GREC secured $4.5 million in funding from the United States Department of Housing and Urban Development (HUD) to develop senior housing in the former nurses’ residence building. Unfortunately, the city government blocked the project's development by withdrawing site control.

The developmental deadlock lasted until 1987 when GREC, with the help of Brooklyn Legal Services, filed a suit against New York City got violating its own Uniform Land Use Review Procedure (ULURP). The Brooklyn Supreme Court agreed and issued a preliminary injunction barring further expansion of the shelter; this marked GREC's first legal victory in its campaign to end expansion of the shelter and begin the site redevelopment plan. However the city government continued to block development.

Frustrated by the issue, local residents staged a protest to raise awareness by blocking the Brooklyn Queens Expressway in May 1989. The three main demands of protesters where:

1. Phase down the shelter to 200 beds
2. Provide GREC with the site control stalled senior citizen housing
3. Establish a timetable for the implementation of the GREC redevelopment plan.

The protest was successful; in September 1989 Mayor Edward Koch reached accord with GREC to phase out the Greenpoint Shelter over a five-year period while phasing in GREC's redevelopment plan. The agreement dictated that by May 1990, five buildings (which housed more than 500 homeless men) were to be vacated and turned over to GREC for rehabilitation as permanent elderly and family housing with 10% if these units going to homeless families; New York City would keep one of the buildings to shelter 200 homeless men and the remaining buildings would be vacated and developed for health and community services. However, in November 1989, the city government again stalled the plan. GREC quickly returned to court and in January 1990, Supreme Court Judge Garry forced the City to vacate four buildings and remove 293 beds (reducing the size to 650 beds). This marked a huge victory for the organization.

GREC member organizations secured financing to rehabilitate the four buildings, creating 45 affordable housing units within the Greenpoint Hospital complex, a task that was accomplished in 13 months. Unfortunately, the green light for full implementation of the GREC plan continued to elude its leaders.

In March 1993 New York City issued another RFP to lease and manage the 650-bed shelter inconsistent with its pledges to reduce the shelter to 200 beds. GREC met this issue with demonstrations and protests, causing Mayor David Dinkins to issue a Memorandum of Understanding (MOU) that gave GREC control of the site and ordered the immediate reduction of the homeless population from 650 to 450 men. It was again agreed that the outpatient building and nurses’ residence building would be relinquished, with the main building being retained to accommodate 200 beds for permanent shelter. With New York City's cooperation, the former outpatient building was acquired by the St. Nicks Alliance and developed as a community facility providing home healthcare, housing, and youth and business development services. The building was named the Greenpoint Renaissance Center. In 2010, the St. Nicks Alliance opened the Art@ Renaissance, which offers 4,500 square feet of space for cultural, art, dance, and music activities. The Arts@ Renaissance program is designed to bring the community together to celebrate its culture.

== Accomplishments on the Greenpoint campus ==
=== Affordable family housing ===
To date, GREC has converted four buildings on the old hospital campus into affordable housing units. (Buildings #4, 5, 6, & 7) Three of them were sponsored by the Neighborhood Women organization and developed into 33 units as the Neighborhood Women Renaissance buildings. These were completed in December 1993. One building is dedicated to Margaret Carnegie and Mildred Johnson of Cooper Park, one is dedicated to Jan Peterson of Neighborhood Women, and one to Theresa and Guido Cianciotta. These units have an average rental cost of $450 for a family unit, as 90% of the tenants are working families.

The total development cost was $3,500,000, and the construction created 35 construction jobs and 2 permanent jobs. The housing was funded by a 30% equity through the Enterprise Foundation, and also through the NYC Housing Preservation and Development, who provided 70% through a low interest loan. The property's 15-year investment cycle is at an end, and is seeking refinancing. One was sponsored by St. Nicks Alliance, and includes 12 units of affordable housing, with the same funding and rent as the other buildings. This project, Northern Daybreak, was completed in May 1993. This building cost $1,300,000 to develop and created 33 construction and 2 permanent jobs. This building is also at the end of its investment cycle and seeking refinancing.

Buildings have been named for important community leaders:

- Tish and Guido Cianciotta of Concerned Citizens of Withers Street and Area Block Association
- Jan Peterson of National Congress of Neighborhood Women
- Margaret Carnegie and Mildred Johnson of Cooper Park Resident's Council

=== The Renaissance Center ===
The Renaissance Center is the renovated outpatient building of the Greenpoint Hospital. It is registered with the NYC Office of Historic Preservation and has been preserved in its neo-classical architecture, but repurposed in its three floors. The upper floors are administration for the St. Nicks Alliance, and the base for many of St. Nicks’ community services, including St. Nicks Home Care. The new basement space has been repurposed into an art center, called Arts@Renaissance, which is “specifically focused on building cross-cultural links,” and which hosts 14 artists in residence for afterschool programs. This building was sponsored by GREC, St. Nicks Alliance, the Home Care department of St. Nicks Alliance, and the Arts@Renaissance center. This building cost $6,100,000 to develop and created 35 construction jobs and 100 permanent jobs.

=== GREC Garden (The Red Shed Garden) ===
GREC and the Brooklyn Borough President were able to use 150 feet of fencing to block off a vacant lot on the west side of Kingsland Avenue, across the street from the community center. They cleared the trash that had been repeatedly thrown there and were able to receive a green thumb lease and plant a community garden. This space now holds a CSA (community-supported agriculture) distribution for local and organically grown flowers, herbs, vegetables, and bushes. The garden is also used as an outdoor classroom. This garden cost $50,000 to develop.

== Further proposals for the Greenpoint campus ==
GREC's priorities for their proposals include the "preservation of historic structure, lower density and stronger economic integration…meeting long-term needs for affordable housing.”

A team led by St. Nicks Alliance, North Brooklyn Development Corporation, Monadnock Construction, and Briarwood Organization has created two proposals:

1. 90 units of senior housing in the Nurse’s Residence and a low-scale eight story addition, as well as a plan for a community facility for health care in the courtyard. This center, the PACE center, will be a special project sponsored by St. Nicks Alliance and costing $3.6 million to develop, creating 35 operational jobs and providing unique “Medicare, private pay, Medicaid-financed initiative [covering] acute, chronic and long term care and avoiding isolation away from family and friends in distant nursing homes."
2. 175 units of mixed-income rental housing, nine stories and containing a mix of studio and up to 3-bedroom apartments. This building will include a courtyard for green space

This plan will cost $69.5 million to develop, as well as creating 120 construction jobs and 6 operational jobs. These proposals have been submitted to the NYC Department of Housing Preservation and Development.
