= McGolrick Park =

Public park in Brooklyn, New York

- Monsignor McGolrick Park and Shelter Pavilion
- U.S. National Register of Historic Places
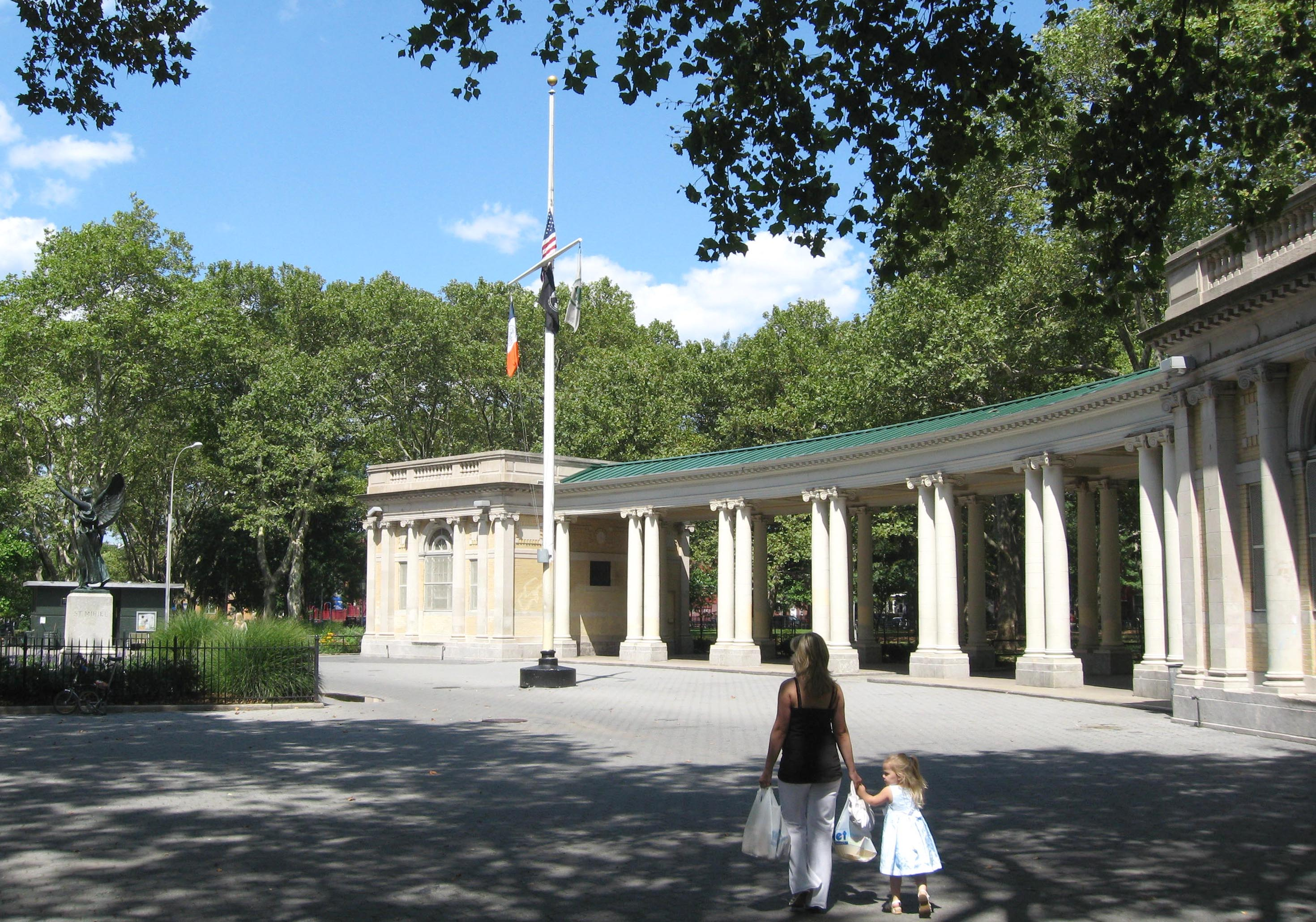
- Shelter Pavilion in late summer

- Location within New York City Location within New York Location within the United States
- Location: Bounded by Nassau and Driggs Avenues, Russell and Monitor Streets, Brooklyn, New York
- Coordinates: 40°43′28″N 73°56′38″W
- Area: 9.1 acres (3.7 ha)
- Built: 1910
- Architect: Helmle & Huberty
- Architectural style: French
- NRHP reference No.: 80002633
- Added to NRHP: May 06, 1980

Monsignor McGolrick Park is located in Greenpoint, Brooklyn, in New York City, between Driggs Avenue to the south, Russell Street to the west, Nassau Avenue to the north, and Monitor Street to the east.

== History ==
The land for the park was acquired by the city in 1889 and the park was open by 1891. It was originally named Winthrop Park after an assemblyman, Col. Winthrop Jones, who acquired the land for purchase and who happened to be the son of the Parks Commissioner. Jones died in 1890, shortly after the park's creation. In 1941 the park was renamed for Monsignor Edward J. McGolrick (1857-1938), the longtime pastor of nearby St. Cecilia's Roman Catholic Church. Winthrop Jones had had no children, and so left no family in Greenpoint to oppose the renaming of the park that he had helped to establish. The park was used as a setting in the 2018 film An Interview with God.

== Features ==
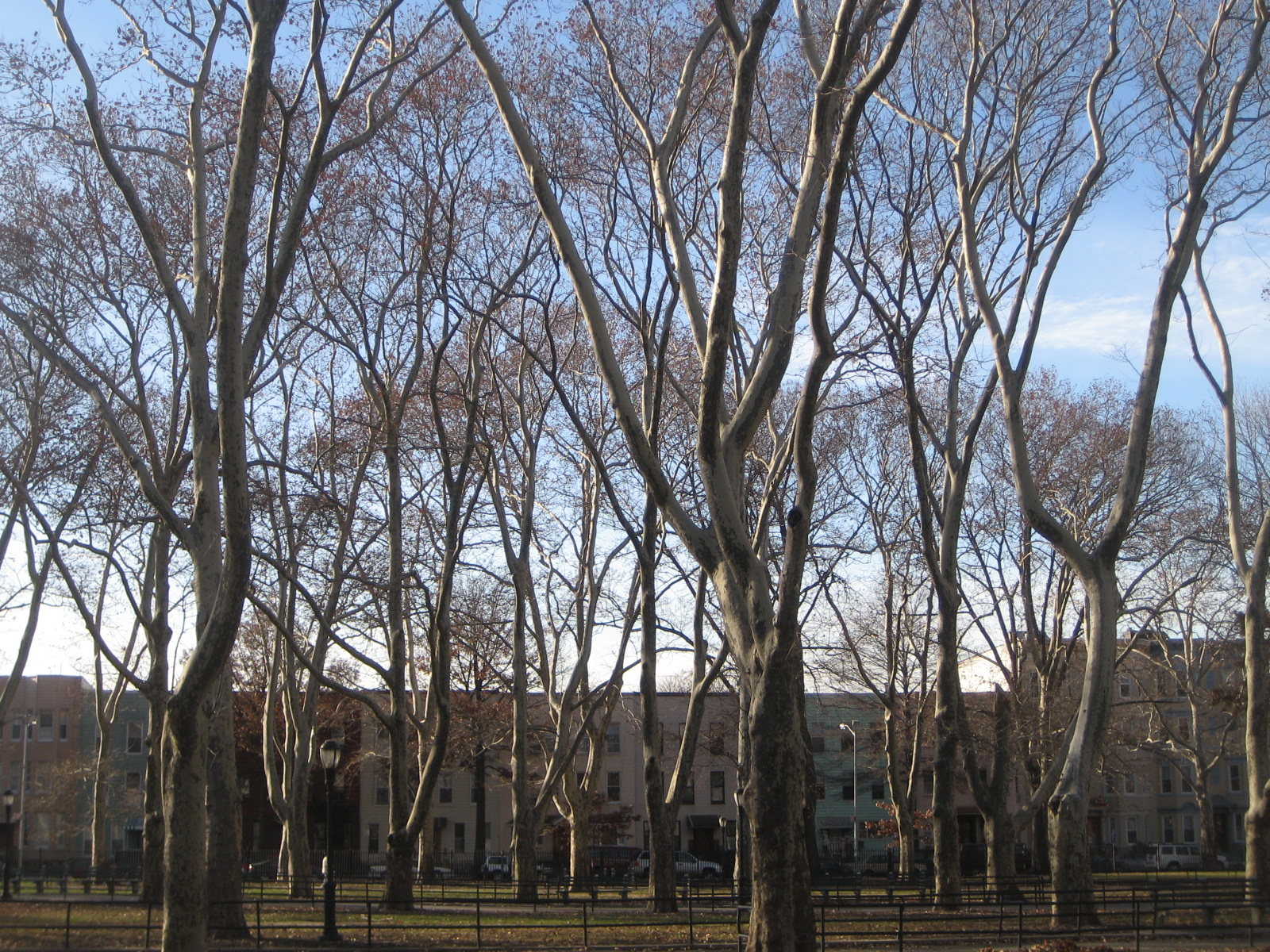
McGolrick Park in early winter

The classical brick and limestone Shelter Pavilion was built in 1910 by Helmle and Huberty. It was designated a New York City Landmark in 1966 and listed on the National Register of Historic Places in 1980. It was rehabilitated in 1985 when founder of Friends of McGolrick Park and at the time Greenpoint Community Coalition Leader Patricia Tambakis saw the decay (graffiti, broken bottles, and litter) of the park while visiting with her child. She and other mothers and members of the community started a petition to have the pavilion renovated.They planted flowers, shrubs, etc. She applied for grants to restore and preserve the park so that everyone could enjoy the green space again.

West of the pavilion stands a bronze winged victory figure created by Carl Augustus Heber in 1923. The monument honors the 150 residents of Greenpoint, Brooklyn, who fought in World War I. The statue depicts a female allegorical figure holding aloft a modified laurel, a symbol of victory, and with her right hand supporting a large palm frond, a symbol of peace. The granite pedestal is inscribed with the names of battle sites in France. The monument was commissioned at a cost of $7,300 by the Greenpoint Memorial Association.

The Monitor and the Merrimac is a sculpture by Antonio de Filippo, which commemorates the Battle of the Monitor and Merrimack. The USS Monitor was built nearby at the Continental Iron Works in Greenpoint and outfitted at the Brooklyn Navy Yard.
