= Brenton Thwaites =

Australian actor (born 1989)

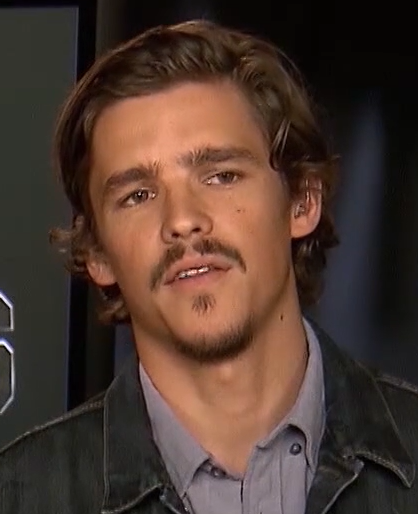
- Thwaites in 2020
- Born: 10 August 1989 (age 37); Cairns, Queensland, Australia
- Occupation: Actor
- Years active: 2010–present
- Partner: Chloe Pacey (2015–present)
- Children: 5

Brenton Thwaites (born 10 August 1989) is an Australian actor. Beginning his career in his home country in 2011, he had a starring role on the series Slide and later appeared on the soap opera Home and Away. Since moving to the United States, Thwaites has had major roles in the films Blue Lagoon: The Awakening (2012), Oculus (2013), The Giver (2014), Gods of Egypt (2016), and Pirates of the Caribbean: Dead Men Tell No Tales (2017). He starred as Dick Grayson / Robin / Nightwing in the DC Universe / HBO Max series Titans from 2018 to 2023.

== Early life ==
Thwaites was born in Cairns, Queensland. He has a sister. He graduated from Cairns State High School in 2006.

During his youth, Thwaites was drawn to the idea of becoming a policeman or a firefighter, having been interested in movies involving the latter. However, his interests changed to filmmaking and "letting [one's] personality shine through so many different characters". At the age of 16, Thwaites gave his first performance in front of a live audience in Romeo and Juliet.

Thwaites studied acting at the Queensland University of Technology (QUT) for three years, before graduating in 2010. He then relocated to Sydney to join the long-running soap opera Home and Away before moving to the United States in 2011/12 to pursue his career in acting.

== Career ==
=== 2010–2011: Early career ===
Prior to graduating from Queensland University of Technology in Brisbane, Thwaites made his film debut in Charge Over You, a 2010 independent film. After he graduated, Thwaites appeared in an episode of Sea Patrol and in the short film Headsmen.

In November 2010, Thwaites was cast in a new Fox8 Australian teen drama series, Slide. The show follows five Brisbane teenagers making their way to adulthood. Thwaites believes his character, Luke Gallagher, "stands back a bit. He watches. He's struggling with family issues. He's drawn in as it was a chance to find better friends and an opportunity to be part of a group. He's a cool, accepted kid. Some friends he can love and help him mature." Thwaites made his first appearance on Slide in the series' premiere episode on 16 August 2011. The series ran one season.

Shortly after Thwaites moved to Sydney in April 2011, he was given a five-month recurring role of Stu Henderson in the 24th season of Home and Away. Thwaites called the show a great learning experience and said his co-stars were easy to work with. Thwaites made his first appearance as Stu, a member of the River Boys, on 23 August 2011. Tristan Swanwick of The Courier-Mail said Thwaites was a "bit too pretty to be a bad-ass River Boy" but that some fake tattoos would balance that impression. Of his character, Thwaites said, "Stu's awesome, he has some fights, he gets the girls, it's awesome fun."

=== 2012–2016: Film roles and continued success ===
Following Thwaites' relocation to the United States, he signed on to play the male lead in the 2012 television film Blue Lagoon: The Awakening opposite Indiana Evans. The film received generally mixed reviews, with Zap2it praising both Thwaites and Evans' "(mostly) believable" acting and The New York Times saying their performances were superior to those of the leads in the first film of the series.

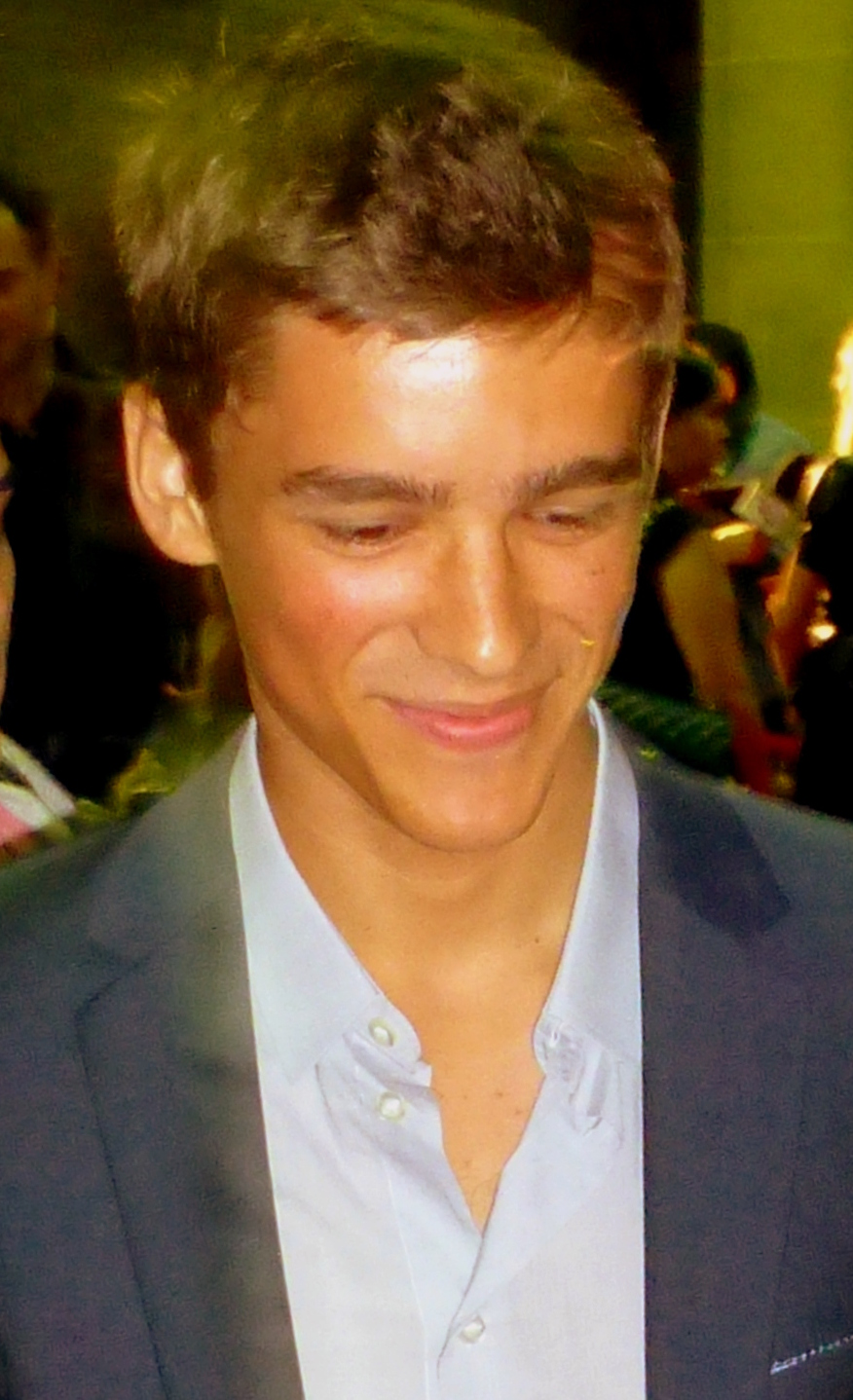
Thwaites at the premiere of Oculus, Toronto Film Festival, 8 September 2013

In 2013, Thwaites starred in the psychological/supernatural horror film Oculus as the male lead Tim Russell. Production on the film began in October 2012 in Alabama, and was completed a few weeks later. The film was first released on 5 September 2013, at the 2013 Toronto International Film Festival, and received a worldwide theatrical release on 11 April 2014. His performance as Russell was well received by Indiewire, which claimed that Thwaites maintained a "credibly frightened demeanor" throughout the film.

In 2014, Thwaites briefly returned to Australia for the filming of crime thriller Son of a Gun. Primarily shot in Perth, Kalgoorlie and Melbourne, Thwaites had to audition for the part of JR "up to 10 times before landing the role." Regarding his character, Thwaites said, "I jumped at the opportunity to audition when this came up and I found the character was a very vulnerable kid amongst strange men that are in some way an inspiration. I just thought that was interesting as a young man myself." Thwaites received critical acclaim for his portrayal of JR, with Variety contending that he "makes a suitably keen-eyed, clean-scrubbed lead, retaining a kind of porous naivete even as the character gets his blood up" and The Sydney Morning Herald praising his role as the embattled hero of the plot. The film premiered in Australia on 16 October 2014.

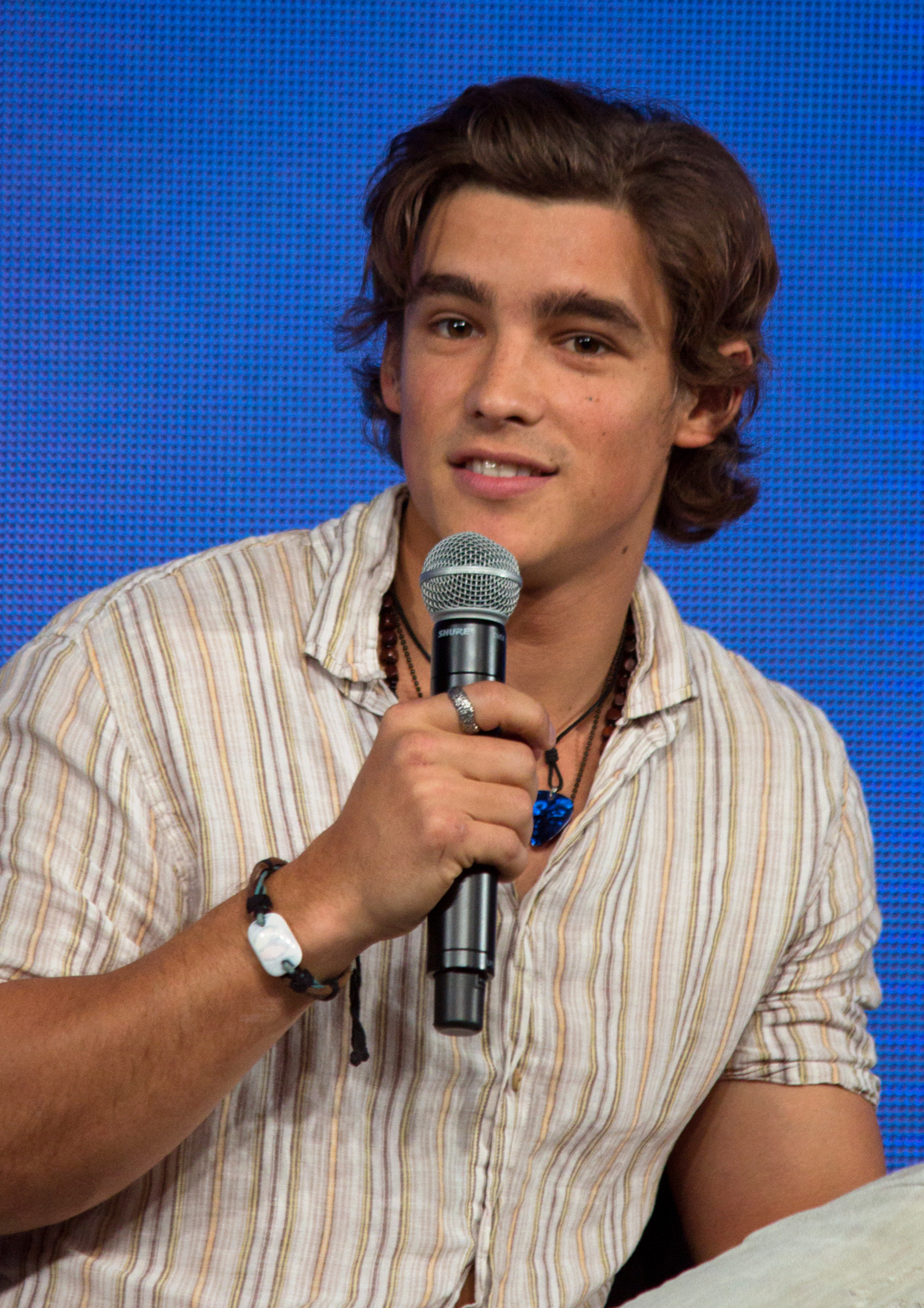
Thwaites in 2014

In 2014, Thwaites appeared in Maleficent as Prince Phillip. A Maleficent sequel was released in 2019, but Harris Dickinson was recast in Thwaites' role as he was unable to return due to scheduling conflicts. Additionally, he starred in The Signal as the male lead, Nic Eastman. The film opened at the Sundance Film Festival in January, seven months after shooting on location in the desert of New Mexico. Thwaites received praise in a review by The Plain Dealer that noted his performance in The Signal was "as a compelling presence in the driver's seat as things get freakier and freakier around him."

Later in the year, Thwaites also had the lead role in The Giver, playing Jonas. Primarily filmed in South Africa, the film was met with generally mixed to negative reviews, with The Telegraph criticising Thwaites' portrayal for "he [struggled] to give us the layered, conflicted hero this film [needed]". However, his portrayal was well received by the Huffington Post, who commended Thwaites' acting and by The Plain Dealer, which noted that the "fast-rising Thwaites...does a nice job with the lead role." He was awarded the Australians in Film "Breakthrough Award" for his role in The Giver.

Thwaites starred in Gods of Egypt. He played Bek, a human thief. Principal photography on the film began on 20 March 2014 at the Fox Studios in Sydney, Australia, and the film was released worldwide on 26 February 2016.

=== 2017–present: Pirates of the Caribbean and Titans ===
Thwaites starred in the fantasy-adventure sequel Pirates of the Caribbean: Dead Men Tell No Tales, which was released on 26 May 2017. Thwaites portrays Henry Turner, the son of franchise characters Will Turner and Elizabeth Swann. Shooting of the film commenced in February 2015, on the Gold Coast of Queensland, Australia.

Following Pirates, Thwaites had a leading role in the 2017 Christian film, An Interview with God, portraying a young journalist, Paul Asher. Thwaites was then cast as Dick Grayson / Robin in the DC Universe series Titans which began airing in 2018.

== Personal life ==
Thwaites has been in a relationship with Chloe Pacey since 2015, after they both lived in the same sharehouse in Australia while Thwaites was filming Pirates of the Caribbean: Dead Men Tell No Tales. After a stint in Los Angeles, Thwaites returned to Queensland. Thwaites and Pacey became engaged on 26 July 2023. The couple have five children.

== Filmography ==
Key
†	Denotes films that have not yet been released

=== Film ===
Year	Title	Role	Notes
2010	Charge Over You	Sam	
2012	Save Your Legs!	Mark Cow	
2013	Oculus	Tim Russell	
2014	The Giver	Jonas	
2014	Maleficent	Prince Phillip	
2014	Ride	Angelo	
2014	The Signal	Nic Eastman	
2014	Son of a Gun	JR White	
2015	Ruben Guthrie	Chet	
2015	That Sugar Film	Himself	Documentary film
2016	Gods of Egypt	Bek	
2017	Pirates of the Caribbean: Dead Men Tell No Tales	Henry Turner	
2018	Office Uprising	Desmond Brimble	Also executive producer
2019	An Interview with God	Paul Asher	
2019	A Violent Separation	Norman Young	
2020	Ghosts of War	Chris	
2020	I Met a Girl	Devon	Also executive producer
2024	How to Make Gravy	Dan	
2025	We Bury the Dead	Clay	
TBA	Stake Out †	TBA	Filming
TBA	The Token Groomsman †	David	Post-production
TBA	Out of the Ashes †	TBA	Post-production

=== Television ===
Year	Title	Role	Notes
2011	Sea Patrol	Leigh Scarpia	Episode: "Black Flights"
2011	Slide	Luke Gallagher	Main role
2011–2012	Home and Away	Stu Henderson	Recurring role
2012	Blue Lagoon: The Awakening	Dean McMullen	Television film
2018–2023	Titans	Dick Grayson / Robin / Nightwing	Main role
2026	Two Years Later	Ryan	Main role

== Awards and nominations ==
Award	Year	Category	Nominated work	Result	Ref.
AiF Breakthrough Award	2014	Up-and-coming talent	The Giver	Won	
EuroCinema Kawananakoa Award	2014	Rising star	–	Won	
GQ Men of the Year	2014	Breakthrough Actor	–	Won	
Teen Choice Awards	2017	Choice Action Movie Actor	Pirates of the Caribbean: Dead Men Tell No Tales	Nominated	
Teen Choice Awards	2019	Choice Action TV Actor	Titans	Nominated	
