= Charlbi Dean =

South African actress (1990–2022)

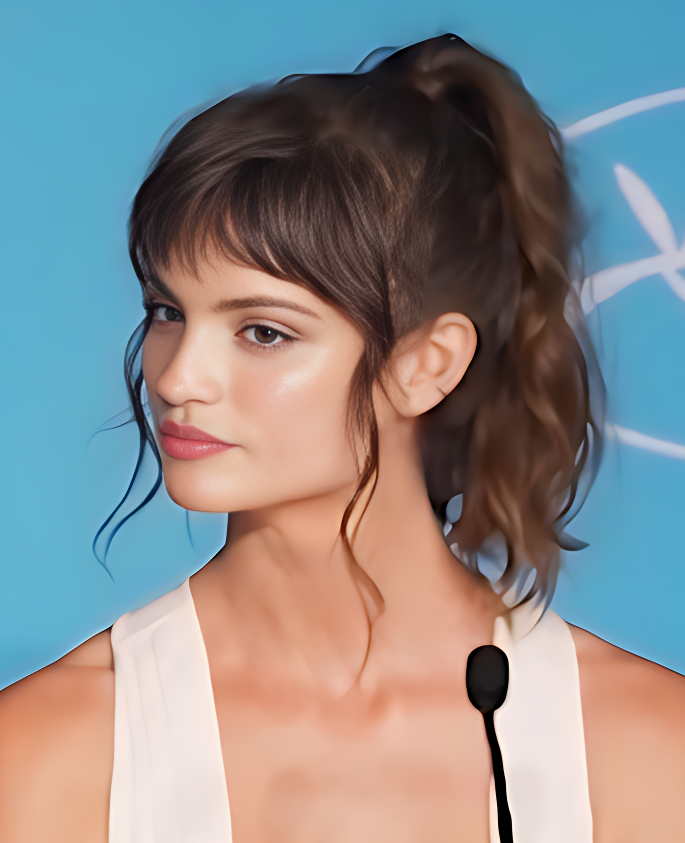
- Dean in 2022 at the Cannes Film Festival
- Born: Charlbi Dean Kriek; 5 February 1990; Cape Town, South Africa
- Died: 29 August 2022 (aged 32); New York City, U.S.
- Occupations: Actress; model
- Years active: 2003–2022
- Partner: Luke Volker (2018–2022)

Charlbi Dean Kriek (/ˈʃɑːrlbi/ SHARL-bee; 5 February 1990 – 29 August 2022) was a South African model and actress. She was best known for her roles in the Spud films (2010–2013), the superhero drama series Black Lightning (2018) and the Palme d'Or-winning dark comedy Triangle of Sadness (2022).

== Early life and career ==
Dean was born on 5 February 1990 to Joanne Muller and Johan Kriek. She had a brother. She began modelling at the age of six, appearing in commercials and catalogues. She signed with Alfa Model Management when she was 12 and was homeschooled from the age of 14. She attended Waterfront Theatre School in her hometown of Cape Town, traveling widely for her career.

In October 2008, Dean and another model survived a car crash. Her injuries included a broken wrist, four broken ribs, and a collapsed lung. She was hospitalised at Milnerton Medi-Clinic and received life-saving surgery. She took a break from her career after the accident.

In 2010, Dean made her acting debut in the film adaptation of Spud as Amanda, a role she reprised in the sequel Spud 2: The Madness Continues. She went on to star in the films Don't Sleep in 2017 and An Interview with God in 2018. Also in 2018, she landed the role of Syonide, a recurring character she played for two seasons of the Arrowverse series Black Lightning. In February 2020, she was cast in a leading role in Ruben Östlund's satirical film Triangle of Sadness, which premiered at the 2022 Cannes Film Festival and won the Palme d'Or. Her performance in the film received praise from critics, some of whom commented that it could have been her breakout role were it not for her death during the film's release.

== Personal life ==
Dean was engaged to fellow South African actor and model Luke Volker, whom she had been dating since 2018.

== Death ==
On 29 August 2022, Dean was admitted to a hospital in New York City after feeling unwell. While her initial symptoms were mild, her condition deteriorated rapidly and she died several hours later; she was 32. Autopsy results confirmed the actress died of bacterial sepsis, which was caused by Capnocytophaga. She was at an elevated risk of serious infections following the removal of her spleen after a car crash in 2008. Dean's death occurred shortly before the international release of Triangle of Sadness. Peter Bradshaw of The Guardian wrote that she "was a true star-in-the-making. Her loss is a huge one... [she] had a singular style and enormous promise".

== Filmography ==
=== Film ===
Year	Film	Role	Notes	Ref.
2010	Spud	Amanda	Comedy	
2012	Illusive Fields	Nadia	Short film	
2013	Death Race 3: Inferno	Calimity J	Action/crime/sci-fi	
2013	Spud 2: The Madness Continues	Amanda	Comedy	
2016	Blood in the Water	Pheebee	Crime/mystery/thriller	
2017	Don't Sleep	Shawn Edmon	Fantasy/horror/thriller; Also starring: Jill Hennessy, Alex Carter, Cary Elwes, Alex Rocco	
2018	An Interview with God	Grace	Drama/mystery; Directed by Perry Lang	
2018	Porthole	Jennifer / Kassidy Kubrick	Comedy/drama/romance; Directed by Mark A. Altman	
2022	Triangle of Sadness	Yaya	Posthumous theatrical release	

=== Television ===
Year	Series	Role	Notes	Ref.
2017	Elementary	Beautiful Woman	Episode: "High Heat"	
2018	Black Lightning	Syonide	Recurring role, 9 episodes	
