= The Token Groomsman =

American Romantic Comedy Film

- Directed by: Natalie Simpkins
- Screenplay by: Natalie Simpkins; John C. Hall; Sohale Andrus Mortazavi
- Story by: John C. Hall
- Produced by: Natalie Simpkins; John C. Hall; Pam Renall
- Starring: Taylor Lautner; Sarah Hyland; Andie MacDowell; Brenton Thwaites; Kane Brown
- Cinematography: Matthew Clark
- Production companies: Radiant Media Films; Appian Way Productions; Hillwood Productions; KC Film; The Fithian Group
- Distributed by: Radiant Media Films; The Fithian Group
- Country: United States
- Language: English

The Token Groomsman is an upcoming romantic comedy film directed, co-written, and co-produced by Natalie Simpkins. It features an ensemble cast including Taylor Lautner, Sarah Hyland, Andie MacDowell, Brenton Thwaites, and Kane Brown.

== Synopsis ==
Scott (Lautner), a career-focused man, is invited to an all-expenses-paid, Italian destination wedding as a groomsman, despite not knowing the groom. His plan to network for investors for his company is complicated when he falls for the groom's sister, Mia (Hyland), creating a conflict with his career-focused plans.

== Cast ==
- Taylor Lautner as Scott, the career-focused groomsman.
- Sarah Hyland as Mia, the groom's sister.
- Andie MacDowell as Aunt Madge.
- Brenton Thwaites as David.
- Kane Brown as Neil, Scott's best friend.

== Production ==
=== Development ===
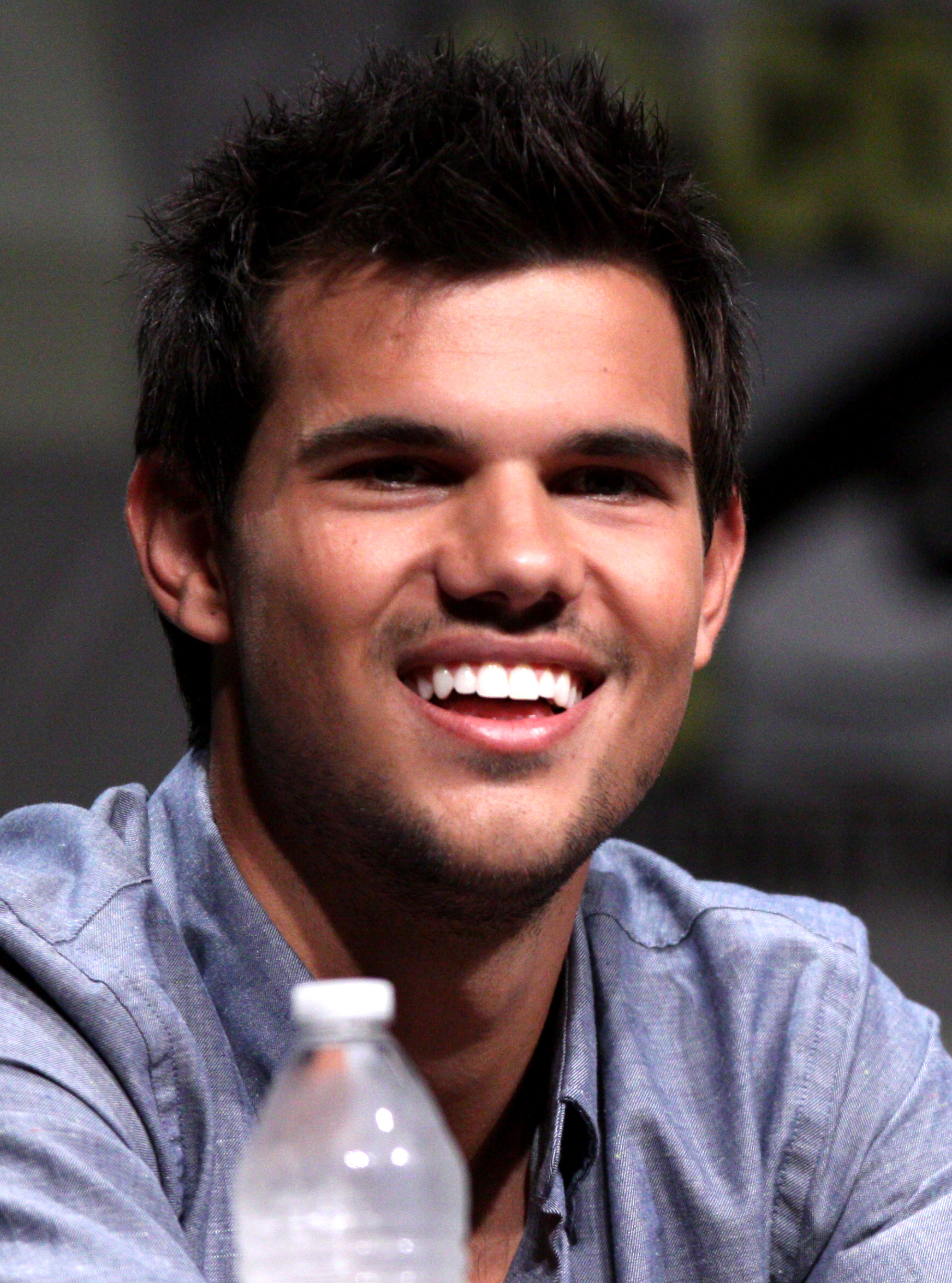
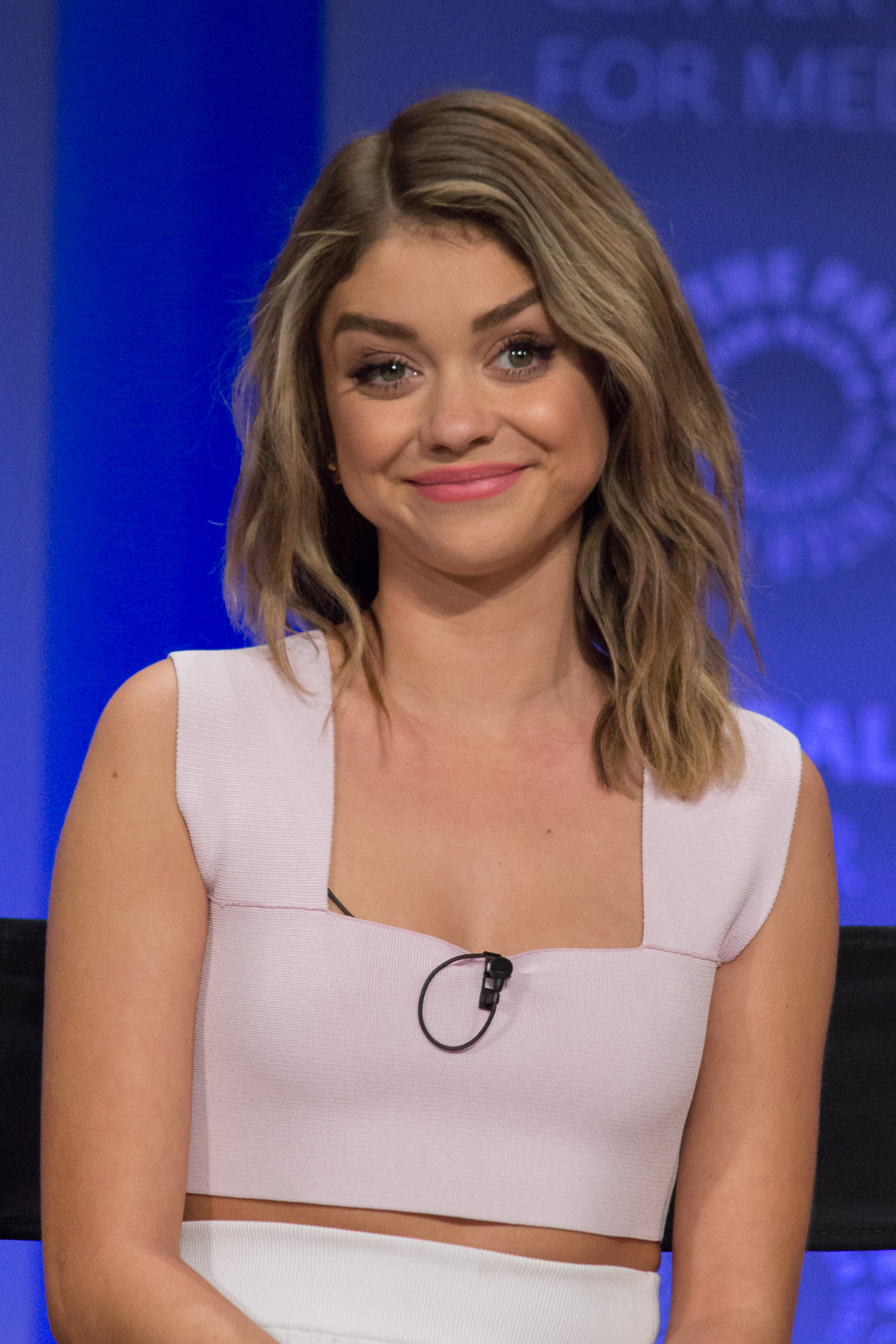
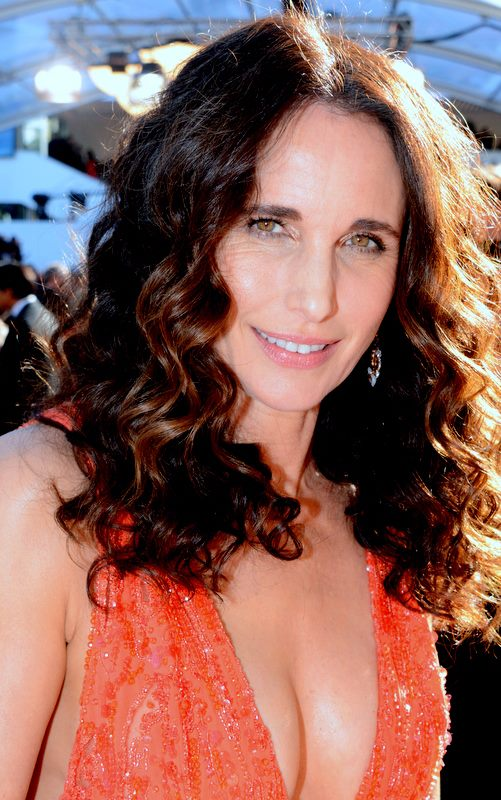
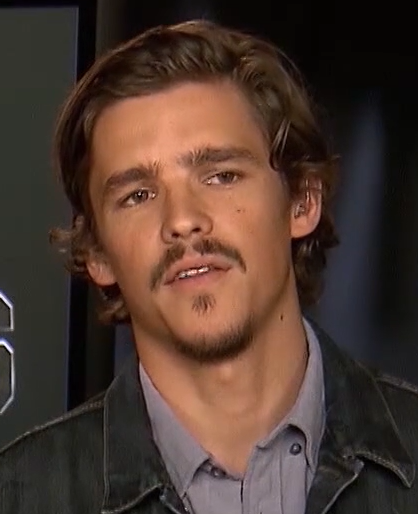
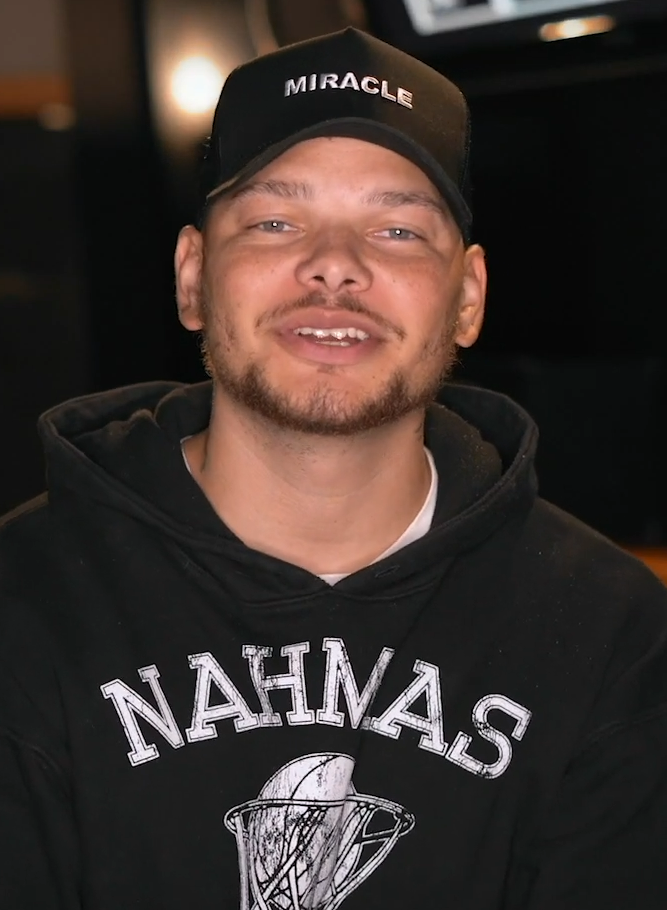
Taylor Lautner, Sarah Hyland, Andie MacDowell, Brenton Thwaites, Kane Brown playing the roles.

The original story was conceived by John C. Hall, who co-wrote the screenplay with Natalie Simpkins and Sohale Andrus Mortazavi. The script was well-received on film financing platforms, and the project secured key attachments, including the director (Simpkins) and production companies, such as Leonardo DiCaprio's Appian Way and Retinue Media. Financing and distribution plans are in place, with Radiant Films International handling international sales and CAA Media Finance overseeing the U.S. theatrical release.

=== Casting ===
In 2024, Taylor Lautner and Sarah Hyland were announced as joining the cast alongside Andie MacDowell. Next, Brenton Thwaites was cast as David, and Kane Brown, the multi-platinum selling country music artist, was announced as making his feature film acting debut as Neil, Scott's best friend. Simpkins noted that Brown brought a unique mix of "vulnerability and magnetism" that perfectly suited the role.

=== Filming ===
Principal photography was scheduled to take place in spring 2026 in Italy.

This schedule follows the film's development and casting announcements throughout 2024 and 2025. The Italian location provides the backdrop for the destination wedding at the center of the story.
