= Don't Sleep (film) =

2017 American fantasy horror film

- Film poster
- Directed by: Rick Bieber
- Written by: Rick Bieber
- Produced by: Rick Bieber
- Starring: Dominic Sherwood; Charlbi Dean; Jill Hennessy; Drea de Matteo; Alex Rocco; Cary Elwes
- Cinematography: Ian Fox
- Edited by: Shilpa Khanna
- Music by: Andy Mendelson
- Release date: September 29, 2017
- Running time: 101 minutes
- Country: United States
- Language: English

Don't Sleep is a 2017 American fantasy horror film written and directed by Rick Bieber and starring Dominic Sherwood, Charlbi Dean, Jill Hennessy, Drea de Matteo, Alex Rocco in his final film before his death in 2015, and Cary Elwes.

== Cast ==
- Drea de Matteo as Jo Marino
- Cary Elwes as Dr. Richard Sommers
- Dominic Sherwood as Zach Bradford
- Charlbi Dean as Shawn Edmon
- Jill Hennessy as Cindy Bradford
- Alex Rocco as Mr. Marino

== Reception ==
The film has a 9% rating on Rotten Tomatoes, based on eleven reviews with an average rating of 4.39/10. Metacritic, which uses a weighted average, assigned the film a score of 26 out of 100, based on 4 critics, indicating "generally unfavorable" reviews.

Jeffrey M. Anderson of Common Sense Media awarded the film one star out of five. Simon Abrams of RogerEbert.com awarded the film two stars.
