= An Interview with God =

- Directed by: Perry Lang
- Written by: Ken Aguado
- Produced by: Ken Aguado; Fred Bernstein
- Starring: David Strathairn; Brenton Thwaites; Hill Harper; Yael Grobglas; Charlbi Dean; Bobby Di Cicco
- Music by: Ian Honeyman
- Production company: Giving Films
- Distributed by: Fathom
- Release date: August 20, 2018
- Running time: 97 minutes
- Country: United States
- Language: English
- Box office: $2.3 million

An Interview with God is a 2018 drama film directed by Perry Lang and written by Ken Aguado. The film stars David Strathairn, Brenton Thwaites, Yael Grobglas, Hill Harper and Charlbi Dean.

== Premise ==
Paul Asher (Brenton Thwaites) is a journalist who has returned home from covering the war in Afghanistan. His life is falling apart. His marriage is near collapse, and he is in a personal crisis. More pressing, a soldier friend from the war is struggling since being discharged, and Paul is desperately trying to help him.

Paul is offered an opportunity too intriguing to resist: an interview with a man (David Strathairn) who claims to be God.

== Production ==
The film was financed by Giving Films, a company that specializes in movies with Christian themes and donates its profits to faith-based nonprofit organizations. It was shot entirely in New York City; McGolrick Park and Kings Theatre are prominently featured. The film's musical score, featuring the use of a solo cello, was composed by Ian Honeyman.

== Release ==
The film was released on 900 screens on August 20, 2018, by Fathom Events. It was screened for potential foreign buyers at the 2018 Cannes Film Festival.

The film debuted on Netflix on March 1, 2019.

== Reception ==
Critical reception to the film was mixed. The review aggregator website Rotten Tomatoes reported that 60% of critics have given the film a positive review, based on five reviews, with an average rating of 6.4/10. Matt's Movie Reviews described the film as "a spiritual journey of the cinematic kind that is as fulfilling as it is perplexing, just as it should be." The Christian Film Review praised the story and acting in what they regarded as "a gripping and thrilling film." The Sydney Morning Herald criticized the writing, arguing that scenes with the two leads "go on for pages of dialogue, a sure way to stop a movie dead in its dramatic tracks."

== Other media ==
Robert Noland and screenwriter Ken Aguado self-published a novelization of the film in 2018. In 2019 in Simsbury, Connecticut, the community theater Theatre Guild of Simsbury hosted a staged reading.
