= Greenpoint Historic District =

Historic district in Brooklyn, New York

- U.S. National Register of Historic Places
- U.S. Historic district
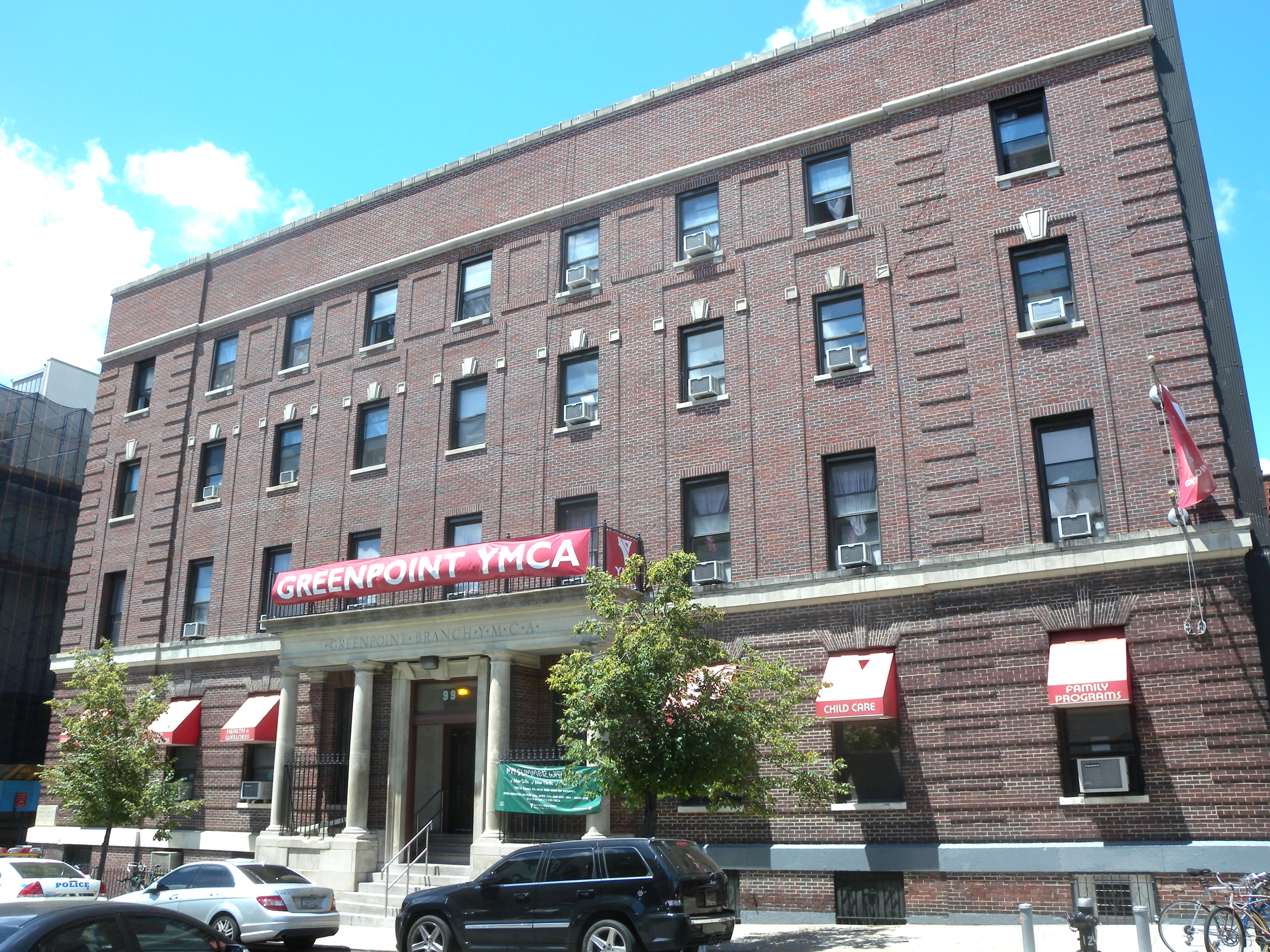
- Greenpoint YMCA

- Location within New York City
- Location: Roughly bounded by Kent, Calyer, Noble, and Franklin Sts., Clifford Pl. and Manhattan Ave., New York, New York
- Coordinates: 40°43′45″N 73°57′20″W
- Area: 43 acres (17 ha)
- Built: 1850
- Architect: Multiple
- Architectural style: Late Victorian, Italianate
- NRHP reference No.: 83001692
- Added to NRHP: September 26, 1983

Greenpoint Historic District is a national historic district in Greenpoint, Brooklyn, New York, New York. It consists of 363 contributing commercial and residential buildings built between 1850 and 1900. It includes both substantial and modest row houses and numerous walk-up apartment buildings, as well as a variety of commercial buildings including the former Eberhard Faber Pencil Factory, six churches, and two banks.

It was listed on the National Register of Historic Places in 1983.
