= Blood in the Water (2016 film) =

- Directed by: Ben Cummings; Orson Cummings
- Written by: Ben Cummings; Orson Cummings
- Produced by: Mitchell Sandler; Mitch Solomon
- Starring: Willa Holland; Alex Russell; Miguel Gomez; David S. Lee; Charlbi Dean
- Cinematography: Michael Alden Lloyd
- Edited by: Suzanne Spangler
- Music by: The Newton Brothers
- Production company: BrothersCummingsFilm
- Release date: 26 August 2016
- Running time: 91 minutes
- Country: United States
- Language: English
- Budget: $500,000

Blood in the Water (originally titled Pacific Standard Time) is a 2016 American thriller film directed by Ben Cummings and Orson Cummings, starring Willa Holland, Alex Russell, Miguel Gomez, David S. Lee and Charlbi Dean.

== Cast ==
- Willa Holland as Veronica
- Alex Russell as Percy
- Miguel Gomez as Freedgood
- David S. Lee as Hector Cortez
- Charlbi Dean as Pheebee
- Stelio Savante as Marius Roos

== Release ==
The film was released on 26 August 2016.

== Reception ==
The Hollywood Reporter wrote that "What might sound on paper like a sexy thriller falls well short in execution, with a script that barely tries to convince us of its characters’ motivations and, when it tries, isn’t very successful."

Noel Murray of the Los Angeles Times wrote that "until the ending, the plot doesn’t really twist much; and the Cummings don’t do enough with how Veronica and Perry’s dim career prospects reflect life for too many college grads these days."
