= Greenpoint, Brooklyn =

Neighborhood in New York City

Greenpoint
- Neighborhood
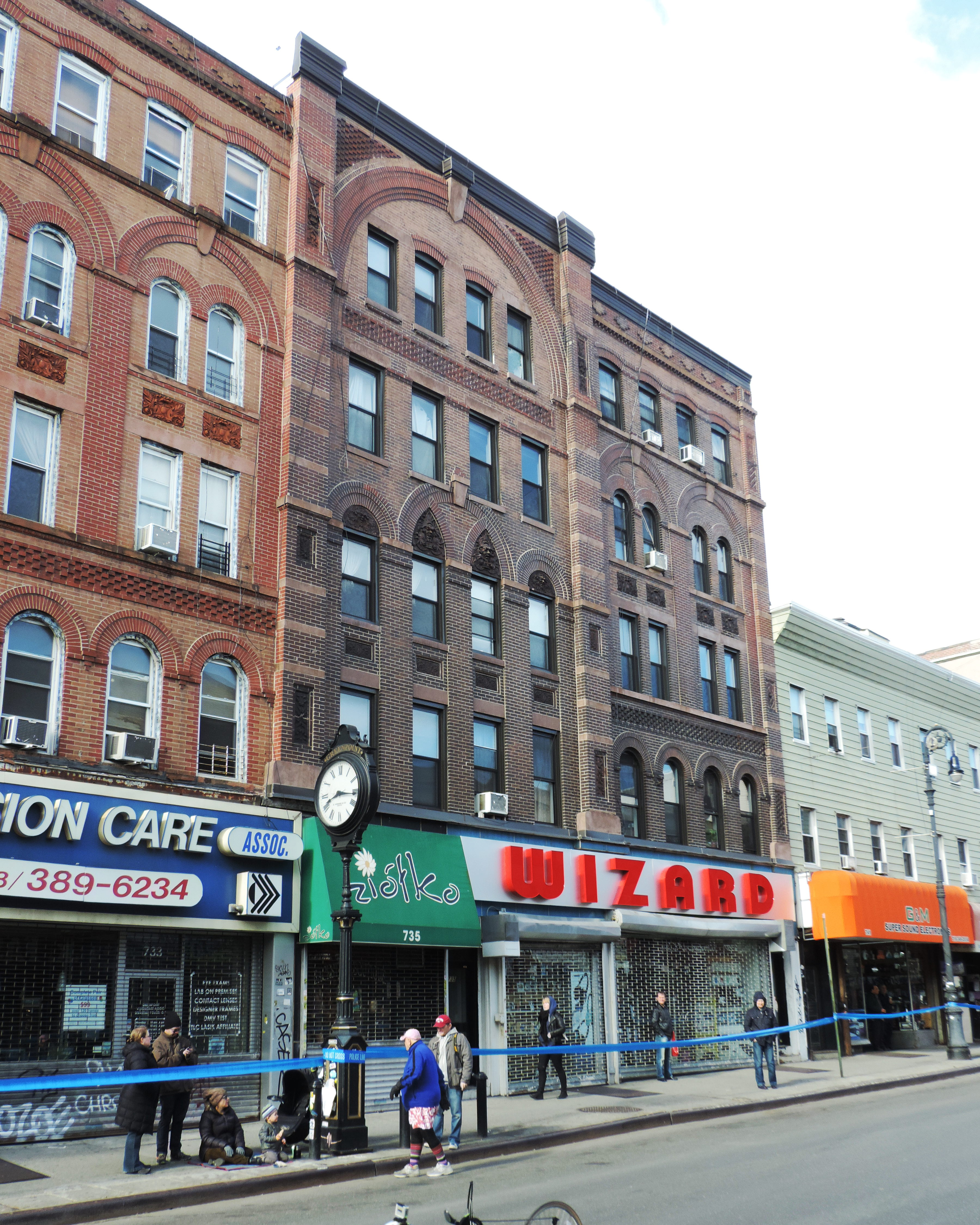
- Greenpoint streetscape on Manhattan Avenue (2014)
- Nickname: "Little Poland"
- Interactive map of Greenpoint
- Coordinates: 40°43′50″N 73°57′05″W
- Country: United States
- State: New York
- City: New York City
- Borough: Brooklyn
- Community District: Brooklyn 1
- Languages: List: 58.4% English; 19% Spanish; 17.3% Polish; 3.1% Russian; 0.7% Korean; 0.4% Hebrew; 0.1% French; 0% Other

Area
  - Total: 1.26 sq mi (3.3 km^{2})

Population (2010)
  - Total: 34,719
  - Density: 27,600/sq mi (10,600/km^{2})

Demographics 2010
  - White: 76.9%
  - Black: 1.2%
  - Hispanic (of any race): 14.7%
  - Asian: 4.9%
  - Other: 2.3%
- ZIP Code: 11222
- Area codes: 718, 347, 929, and 917
- Median household income: $60,523

Greenpoint is the northernmost neighborhood in the New York City borough of Brooklyn. It is bordered on the southwest by Williamsburg at Bushwick Inlet Park and McCarren Park; on the southeast by the Brooklyn–Queens Expressway and East Williamsburg; on the north by Newtown Creek and the neighborhood of Long Island City in Queens; and on the west by the East River. The neighborhood has a large Polish immigrant and Polish-American community, containing many Polish restaurants, markets, and businesses, and it is often referred to as "Little Poland".

Originally farmland—many of the farm owners' family names, such as Meserole (Messerole) and Calyer, are current street names—the residential core of Greenpoint was built on parcels divided during the Industrial Revolution and late 19th century, with rope factories and lumber yards lining the East River to the west, while the northeastern section along the Newtown Creek through East Williamsburg became an industrial maritime area.

Greenpoint has long held a reputation of being a working class and immigrant neighborhood, and it initially attracted families and workers with its abundance of factory jobs, heavy industry and manufacturing, shipbuilding, and longshoreman or dock work. Since the early 2000s, a building boom in the neighborhood has made the neighborhood increasingly a center of nightlife and gentrification, and a 2005 rezoning enabled the construction of high density residential buildings on the East River waterfront. There have also been efforts to reclaim the rezoned East River waterfront for recreational use and also to extend a continuous promenade into the Newtown Creek area.

Greenpoint is part of Brooklyn Community District 1, and its primary ZIP Code is 11222. It is patrolled by the 94th Precinct of the New York City Police Department.

== History ==
=== Early colonization and agricultural era ===
Landmarked 19th-century rowhouses in the Greenpoint Historic District

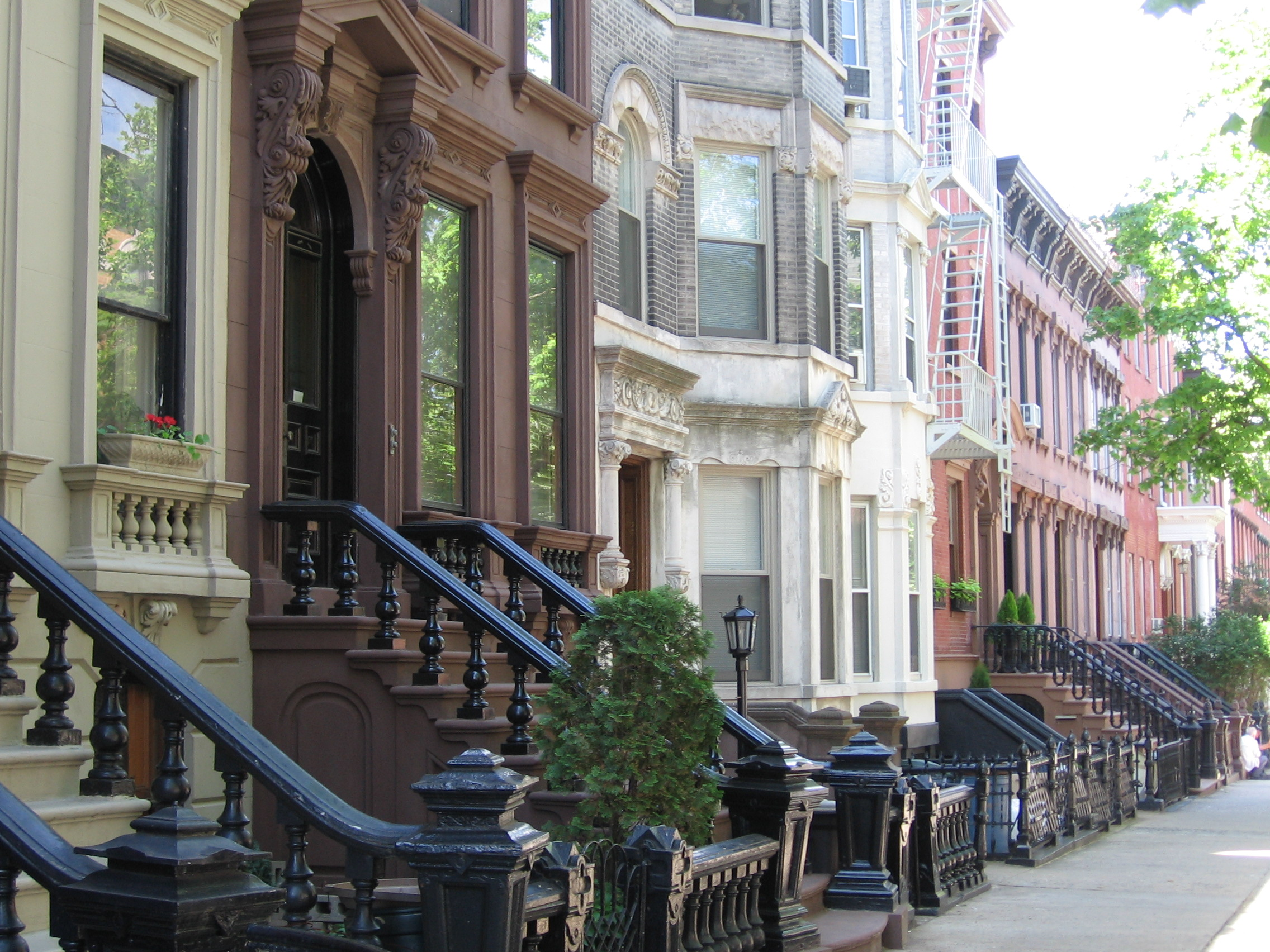
Kent Street

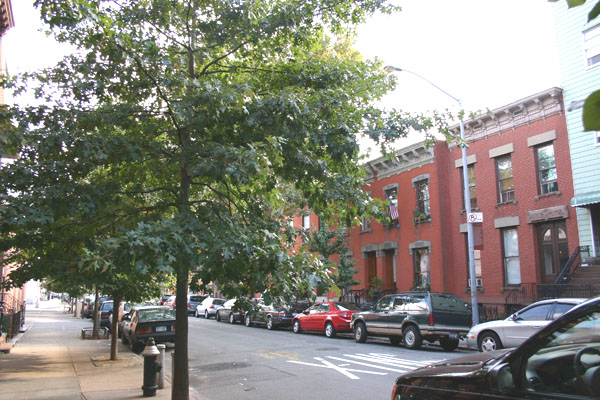
Lorimer Street

At the time of European settlement in New York, Greenpoint was inhabited by the Keskachauge (Keshaechqueren) Indians, a sub-tribe of the Lenape. Contemporary accounts describe the area as remarkably verdant and beautiful, with Jack pine and oak forest, meadows, fresh water creeks and briny marshes. Water fowl and fish were abundant. European settlers originally used the "Greenpoint" name to refer to a small bluff of land jutting into the East River at what is now the westernmost end of Freeman Street, but eventually it came to describe the whole peninsula.

In 1638, the Dutch West India Company negotiated the right to settle Brooklyn from the Lenape. The first recorded European settler of what is now Greenpoint was Dirck Volckertsen (Batavianized from Holgerssøn), a Norwegian immigrant who in 1645 built a 1 1/2-story farmhouse there with the help of two Dutch carpenters. It was built in the contemporary Dutch style just west of what is now the intersection of Calyer Street and Franklin Street. There he planted orchards and raised crops, sheep and cattle. He was called Dirck de Noorman by the Dutch colonists of the region, Noorman being the Dutch word for "Norseman" or "Northman". The creek that ran by his farmhouse became known as Norman Kill (Creek); it ran into a large salt marsh and was later filled in.

Volckertsen received title to the land after prevailing in court one year earlier over a Jan De Pree, who had a rival claim. He initially commuted to his farm by boat and may not have moved into the house full time until after 1655, when the small nearby settlement of Boswyck was established, on the charter of which Volckertsen was listed along with 22 other families. Volckertsen's wife, Christine Vigne, was a Walloon. Volckertsen had had periodic conflicts with the Keshaechqueren, who killed two of his sons-in-law and tortured a third in separate incidents throughout the 1650s. Starting in the early 1650s, he began selling and leasing his property to Dutch colonists, among them Jacob Haie (Hay) in 1653, who built a home in northern Greenpoint that was burned down by Indians two years later. Jan Meserole established a farm in 1663; his farmhouse at what is now 723 Manhattan Avenue stood until 1919 and last served as a Young Women's Hebrew Association.

The Hay property and other holdings came into the possession of Pieter Praa, a captain in the local militia, who established a farm near present-day Freeman Street and McGuinness Boulevard, and went on to own most of Greenpoint. Volckertsen died in about 1678 and his grandsons sold the remainder of the homestead to Pieter Praa when their father died in 1718; the name of Norman Avenue remains as testimony to Volckertsen's legacy. Praa had no male heirs when he died in 1740, but the farming families of his various daughters formed the core of Greenpoint for the next hundred years or so. By the time of the American Revolutionary War, Greenpoint's population was entirely five related families:

- Abraham Meserole, a grandson of Pieter Praa, and his family lived on the banks of the East River between the present-day India and Java Streets;
- Jacob Meserole (brother of Abraham) and his family farmed the entire south end of Greenpoint and built a house between present day Manhattan Avenue and Lorimer Street near Norman Avenue;
- Jacob Bennett, son-in-law of Pieter Praa, and his family farmed the land in the northern portion of Greenpoint and built their house near present-day Clay Street roughly between present day Manhattan Avenue and Franklin Street;
- Jonathan Provoost, son-in-law of Pieter Praa, and his family farmed the eastern portion of Greenpoint, and lived in the house built by Praa;
- Jacobus Calyer, a grandson-in-law of Pieter Praa, and his family farmed the western portion of Greenpoint, and lived in the house built by Volckertsen.

The British Army had an encampment in Greenpoint during the American Revolution, which caused considerable hardship for the families; Abraham Meserole's son was imprisoned on suspicion of revolutionary sympathies.

Throughout the 18th and early 19th centuries, the farms were quite isolated from the rest of Brooklyn, connected only to one another by farm lanes and to the rest of Bushwick Township by a single road, Wood Point Road (now Bushwick Avenue). The families used long boats to travel to Manhattan to sell their farm produce. Little historical information exists about this period of Greenpoint's history other than the personal papers and recorded oral history of these five families.

=== 19th-century industrialization ===
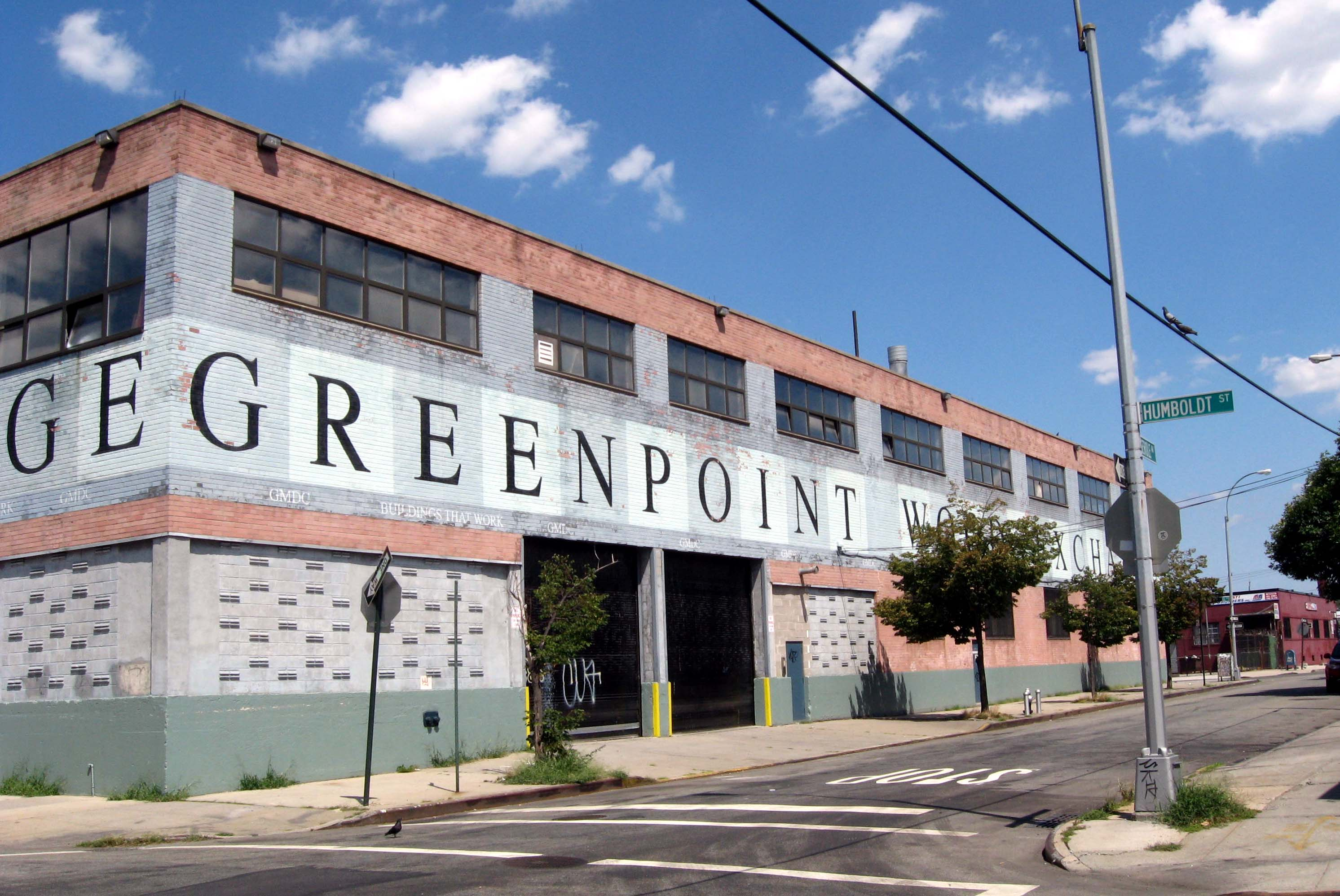
The Greenpoint Wood Exchange, where lumber is processed

Greenpoint first began to change significantly when entrepreneur Neziah Bliss married into the Meserole family in the early 1830s after purchasing land from them. He eventually bought out most of the land in Greenpoint. In 1834, he had the area surveyed, and in 1839 opened a public turnpike along what is now Franklin Street. He established regular ferry service to Manhattan around 1850. All of these initiatives contributed to the rapid and radical transformation of Greenpoint, which was annexed to the City of Brooklyn in 1855.

In the years that followed, Greenpoint established itself as a manufacturing district. Its largest industries were shipbuilding, porcelain and pottery, and glassworks, but the area had other industrial concerns such as brass and iron foundries; breweries; drug plants; book, furniture, box, and boiler makers; sugar refineries; and machine shops. The Germans and the Irish arrived in the mid-19th century and large numbers of Poles began arriving before the turn of the century. The homes built for the merchants and the buildings erected for their workers sprang up along streets that lead down to the waterfront. Today, this area is on the National Register of Historic Places as the Greenpoint Historic District.

Greenpoint's East River waterfront holds the maritime history of the community. The buildings that formerly manufactured the ropes for the shipbuilding industry are still there. Long a site of shipbuilding, the neighborhood's dockyards were used to build the USS Monitor, the Union Army's first ironclad fighting ship built during the American Civil War. It was launched on Bushwick Creek. The Monitor, together with seven other ironclads, was built at the Continental Ironworks in Greenpoint. Glass-making was also a large industry in Greenpoint, and by the 1880s the neighborhood housed 18 of the 20 glass makers in the city of Brooklyn, as well as all of the porcelain and pottery manufacturers in the city.

Charles Pratt's Astral Oil Works also opened on the Greenpoint waterfront in the 1860s. Pratt sold his interest to John D. Rockefeller's recently formed Standard Oil Trust in 1874. By 1875, Greenpoint had some 50 refineries. The Astral Apartments were built as housing for workers at Astral Oil in 1886.

An American manufacturer of porcelain wares who operated between 1862 and 1922, the Union Porcelain Works, had their factory located at 300 Eckford Street in Greenpoint. According to the New York City Landmarks Preservation Commission designation report the company was "one of the most famous in the country, both for its innovative approach to the manufacture of porcelain and for the quality of its products which was highly regarded on both sides of the Atlantic" and was "a major force in shaping an American stylistic tradition for ceramics and porcelain".

=== 20th and 21st centuries ===
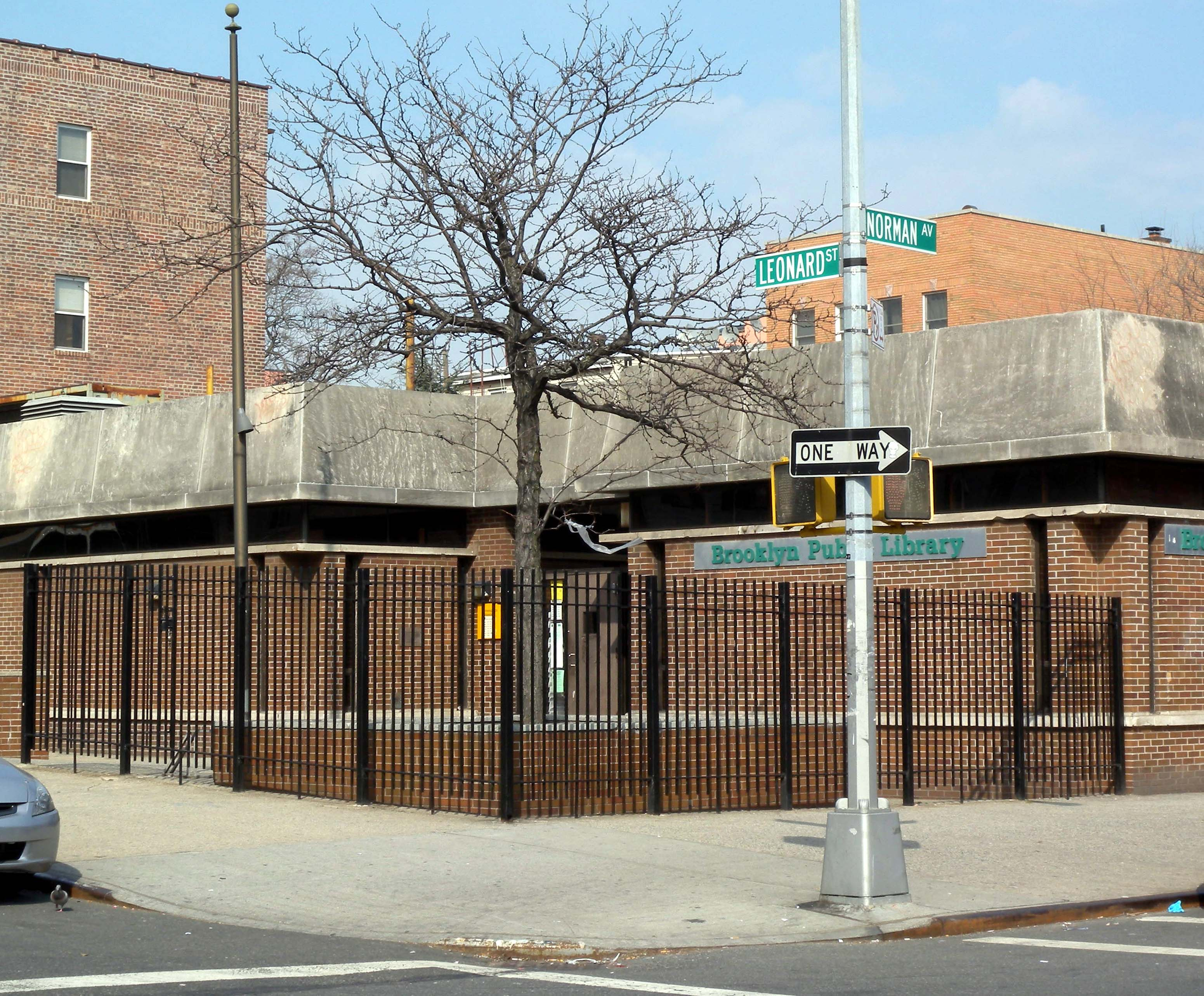
Public library (demolished 2017)

The petroleum industry continued to expand, despite the occasional catastrophe. On September 13, 1919, the Standard Oil refinery caught fire and soon spread flaming liquids into neighboring oil works and Newtown Creek.

In 1933, Greenpoint gained access to the New York City Subway, with the opening of the IND Crosstown Line (currently serving the G train), running under Manhattan Avenue from Nassau Avenue to Queens. In 1937, the line was extended to Downtown Brooklyn, providing direct access from Greenpoint to points south.

The manufacturing industry of Greenpoint declined after World War II. Eberhard Faber's pencil factory, once the largest manufacturer of lead pencils in the United States, operated on West Street from 1872 until 1956. The company's former buildings were designated a historic district by the New York City Landmarks Preservation Commission in 2007.

The Greenpoint Historic District was listed on the National Register of Historic Places in 1983.

==== Environmental difficulties and litigation ====
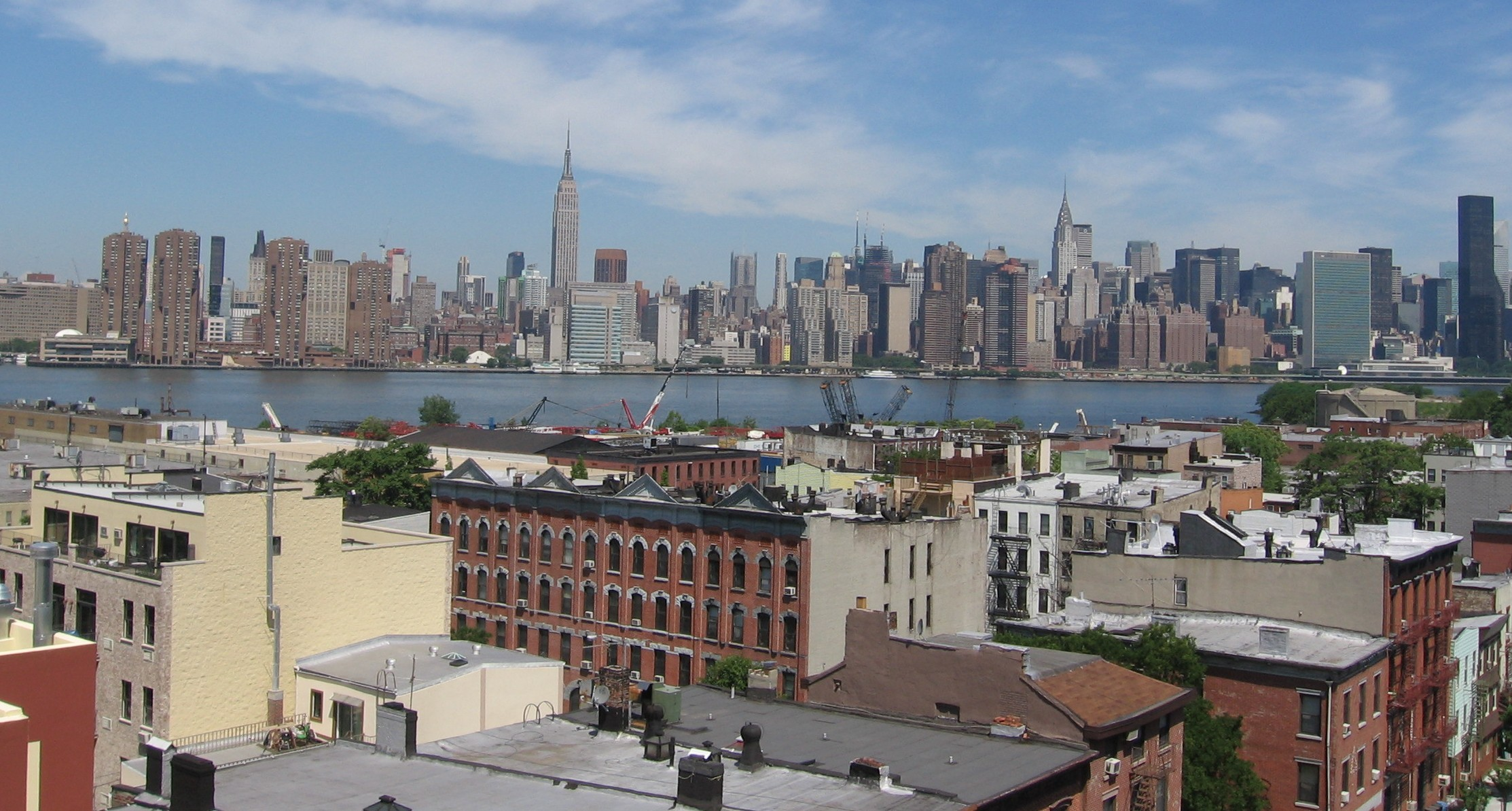
Aerial picture of Greenpoint's East River waterfront, with Manhattan in background

Greenpoint community residents and activists have periodically banded together, sometimes with the aid of their local representatives, to fight highly polluting facilities and practices in the neighborhood. Such organization led the city to close the huge Greenpoint incinerator in 1994, which was out of compliance with all city, state and federal regulations. In the late 1980s, after an increasing series of highly odorous releases from the Sewage Treatment Plant which served a good portion of Lower Manhattan, a local group formed calling itself GASP (Greenpointers Against Smell Pollution) that compelled the city to control the outflows and to plan a vastly expanded facility that took 20 years to build. The mid-1980s saw a great increase in the number of trucks driving through the neighborhood with municipal waste, often toxic waste, to be held at "transfer stations".

During the 1950 Greenpoint oil spill, at the time the largest oil spill in United States history, 17 to 30 million U.S. gallons (64×10^{6} to 114×10^{6} L) of oil spilled into Newtown Creek. Oil is believed to have been seeping into the groundwater since then. Groundwater in this area is not used as drinking water, as all of New York City's drinking water presently comes from upstate reservoirs. However, local activists have been campaigning ever since to clean up the spill. On October 20, 2005, residents near the oil recovery operation, which is located in the predominantly commercial/industrial eastern section of Greenpoint near the East Williamsburg Industrial Park, filed a lawsuit against ExxonMobil, BP and Chevron Corporation in Brooklyn State Supreme Court, alleging they have suffered adverse health consequences. ExxonMobil, which has been slowly removing oil from its former facilities in the area, have denied liability for the oil leaking into Newtown Creek and suggested fault lies instead with Chevron. The Environmental Protection Agency's (EPA) "Newtown Creek/Greenpoint Oil Spill Study Brooklyn, New York" states that vapor concentrations in "some commercial establishments" were found "above the Upper Explosive Limit"; i.e. there was so much vapor that no explosion could ignite. The same EPA study said, "A review of the data collected by the NYSDEC shows that, in general, chemicals were detected at all locations in each home, but not in a pattern that would typically represent a vapor intrusion phenomenon."

==== 2005 rezoning ====
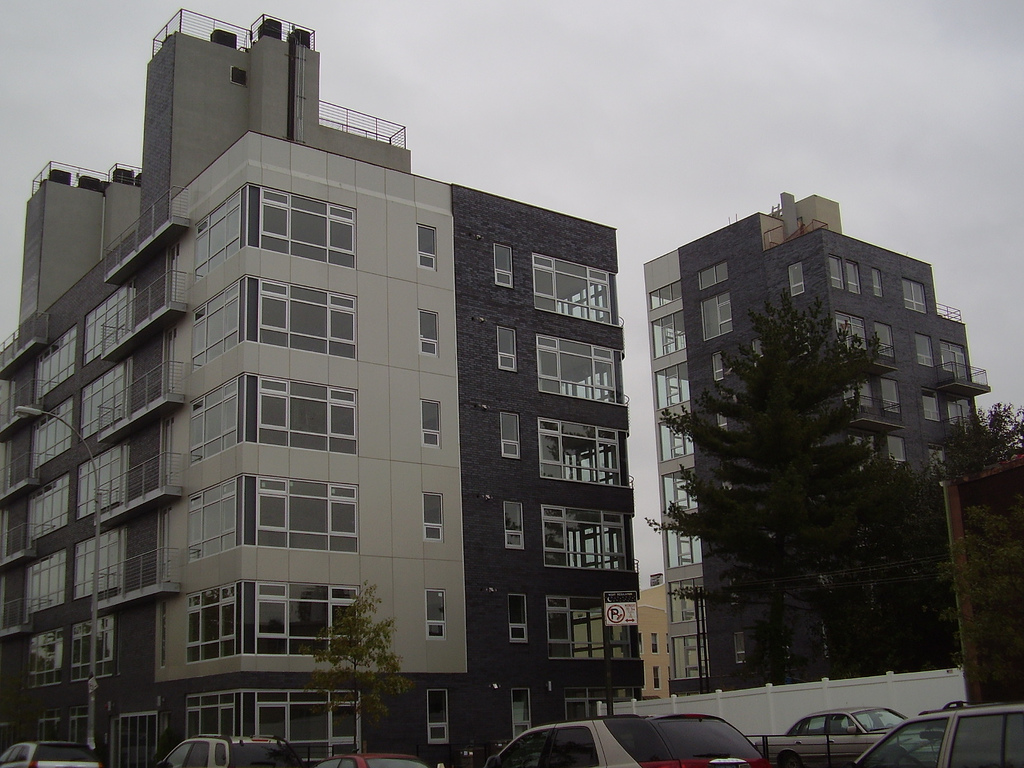
Condominiums in Greenpoint

On May 11, 2005, New York City's Department of City Planning approved a rezoning of 175 blocks in Greenpoint and Williamsburg. According to the project's Environmental Impact Statement, the rezoning was expected to bring approximately 16,700 new residents to the neighborhood by 2013 in 7,300 new units of housing. 250,000 square feet (23,000 m^{2}) of new retail space are projected, along with a corresponding loss of just over 1,000,000 square feet (93,000 m^{2}) of existing industrial capacity. The rezoning also includes a 28-acre (110,000 m^{2}) waterfront park. Included in its requirements are provisions for a promenade along the East River, built piecemeal by the developers of existing waterfront lots. An inclusionary housing plan was included in the resolution and provides height bonuses along the waterfront and in Northside Williamsburg for developers providing apartments at rates considered affordable for low-income households (below 80% of the area's median income); on the waterfront, these bonuses could allow for up to seven-story height increases.

The rezoning was a dramatic change in scale to a previously low-slung, industrial neighborhood. The proposed changes were the subject of much debate, including a letter written by activist Jane Jacobs to mayor Michael Bloomberg criticizing the proposed development.

The community's plan does not cheat the future by neglecting to provide provisions for schools, daycare, recreational outdoor sports, and pleasant facilities for those things. The community's plan does not promote new housing at the expense of both existing housing and imaginative and economical new shelter that residents can afford. The community's plan does not violate the existing scale of the community, nor does it insult the visual and economic advantages of neighborhoods that are precisely of the kind that demonstrably attract artists and other live–work craftsmen ... [but] the proposal put before you by city staff is an ambush containing all those destructive consequences.

Other organizations, including the city government and various advocacy groups such as the Manhattan Institute, argued that residential construction in underused manufacturing zones is essential to meet growing housing demand. Rezoning promised double-digit percentage growth in the number of housing units, leading these groups to claim that it would help to alleviate the city's housing shortage and possibly slow rent increases. Critics argued that the existing community's character would be changed as existing residents were forced to move, and, further, that public transportation and public safety infrastructure would be unable to accommodate the projected 40,000 new residents.

A boom in construction followed the rezoning, leading to complaints from neighborhood residents and their elected representatives. The zoning plan was modified on March 2, 2006, to include anti-harassment provisions for tenants and add height limits in portions of upland Williamsburg. Neighborhood organizations made differing opinions known: the Greenpoint-Williamsburg Association for Parks and Planning expressed approval of the proposal (with reservations), but many neighborhood residents and members of Community Board 1 continue to voice their objections. One of the largest developments to be built after the rezoning was Greenpoint Landing, which includes ten residential towers containing 5,500 units, a public elementary and middle school, and 4 acres (1.6 ha) of parkland. Greenpoint Landing began construction in 2015 and is expected to be completed before 2027. By spring 2017, one building had opened.

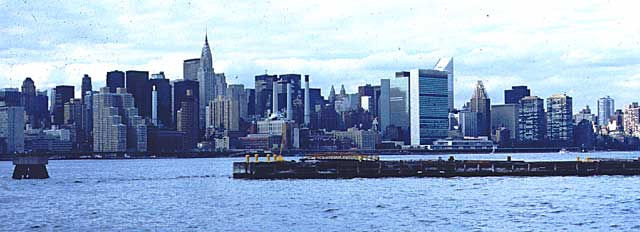
View of Manhattan from Greenpoint, with Green Street Pier in foreground

== Demographics ==
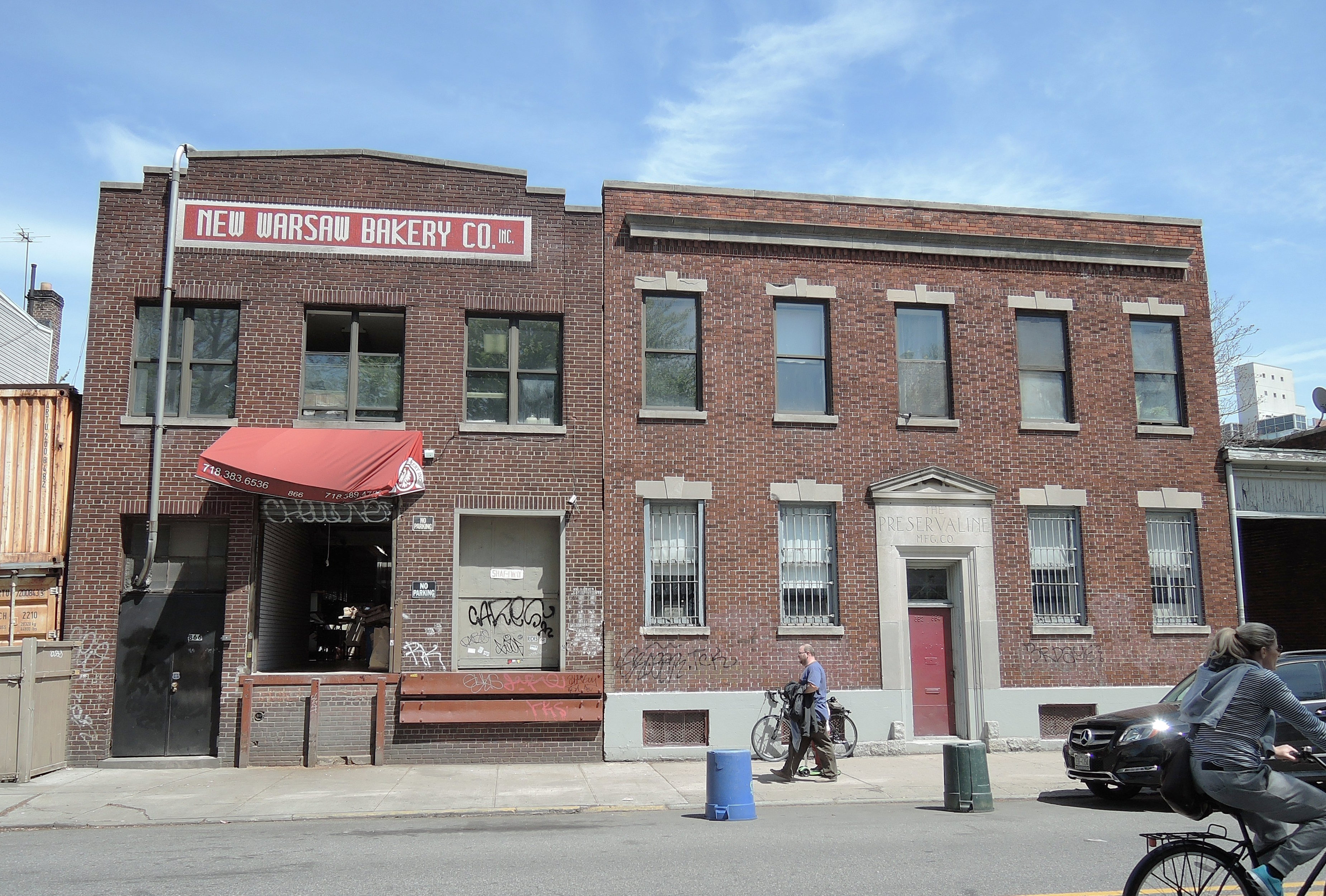
New Warsaw Polish Bakery, 2014

Greenpoint's population is largely working class and multi-generational; it is common to find three generations of family members living in the community. The neighborhood is sometimes referred to as "Little Poland" due to its large population of Polish immigrants and Polish-Americans, reportedly the second largest concentration in the United States after Chicago. Although Polish immigrants and people of Polish descent are present in force, there is a significant Latino population living mostly north of Greenpoint Avenue, and Greenpoint has a significant number of South Asian and North African residents.

Based on data from the 2010 United States census, the population of Greenpoint was 34,719, a decrease of 3,102 (8.2%) from the 37,821 counted in 2000. Covering an area of 809.13 acres (327.44 ha), the neighborhood had a population density of 42.9 inhabitants per acre (27,500/sq mi; 10,600/km^{2}).

The racial makeup of the neighborhood was 76.9% (26,691) White and 14.7% (5,099) Hispanic or Latino. Other ethnicities include 1.2% (433) African American, 0.1% (48) Native American, 4.9% (1,689) Asian, 0.0% (10) Pacific Islander, 0.5% (161) from other races, and 1.7% (588) from two or more races.

The entirety of Community Board 1, which comprises Greenpoint and Williamsburg, had 199,190 inhabitants as of NYC Health's 2018 Community Health Profile, with an average life expectancy of 81.1 years. This is about the same as the median life expectancy of 81.2 for all New York City neighborhoods. Most inhabitants are middle-aged adults and youth: 23% are between the ages of 0 and 17, 41% between 25 and 44, and 17% between 45 and 64. The ratio of college-aged and elderly residents was lower, at 10% and 9% respectively.

As of 2016, the median household income in Community Board 1 was $76,608. In 2018, an estimated 17% of Greenpoint and Williamsburg residents lived in poverty, compared to 21% in all of Brooklyn and 20% in all of New York City. Less than one in fifteen residents (6%) were unemployed, compared to 9% in the rest of both Brooklyn and New York City. Rent burden, or the percentage of residents who have difficulty paying their rent, is 48% in Greenpoint and Williamsburg, higher than the citywide and boroughwide rates of 52% and 51% respectively. Based on this calculation, as of 2018, Greenpoint and Williamsburg are considered to be gentrifying.

As according to the 2020 census data from New York City Department of City Planning, there were between 20,000 and 29,999 White residents and between 5,000 and 9,999 Hispanic residents, meanwhile each the Asian and Black populations were each under 5000 residents.

== Political representation ==
Politically, Greenpoint is in New York's 7th congressional district. It is in the New York State Senate's 18th and 59th districts, the New York State Assembly's 50th district, and the New York City Council's 33rd district.

== Police and crime ==
Greenpoint is patrolled by the 94th Precinct of the NYPD, located at 100 Meserole Avenue. The 94th Precinct ranked 50th safest out of 69 patrol areas for per-capita crime in 2010. As of 2018, with a non-fatal assault rate of 34 per 100,000 people, Greenpoint and Williamsburg's rate of violent crimes per capita is less than that of the city as a whole. The incarceration rate of 305 per 100,000 people is lower than that of the city as a whole.

The 94th Precinct has a lower crime rate than in the 1990s, with crimes across all categories having decreased by 72.9% between 1990 and 2018. The precinct reported one murder, six rapes, 63 robberies, 115 felony assaults, 141 burglaries, 535 grand larcenies, and 62 grand larcenies auto in 2018.

== Fire safety ==
The New York City Fire Department (FDNY) operates two fire stations in Greenpoint. Engine Company 238/Ladder Company 106 is located at 205 Greenpoint Avenue and serves most of the neighborhood. The southern part of Greenpoint is served by Engine Company 229/Ladder Company 146, located at 75 Richardson Street.

== Health ==
As of 2018, preterm births and births to teenage mothers are less common in Greenpoint and Williamsburg than in other places citywide. In Greenpoint and Williamsburg, there were 54 preterm births per 1,000 live births (the lowest in the city, compared to 87 per 1,000 citywide), and 16.0 births to teenage mothers per 1,000 live births (compared to 19.3 per 1,000 citywide). Greenpoint and Williamsburg has a relatively low population of residents who are uninsured, or who receive healthcare through Medicaid. In 2018, this population of uninsured residents was estimated to be 7%, which is lower than the citywide rate of 12%.

The concentration of fine particulate matter, the deadliest type of air pollutant, in Greenpoint and Williamsburg is 0.0096 milligrams per cubic metre (9.6×10^{−9} oz/ft^{3}), higher than the citywide and boroughwide averages. Seventeen percent of Greenpoint and Williamsburg residents are smokers, which is slightly higher than the city average of 14% of residents being smokers. In Greenpoint and Williamsburg, 23% of residents are obese, 11% are diabetic, and 25% have high blood pressure—compared to the citywide averages of 24%, 11%, and 28% respectively. In addition, 23% of children are obese, compared to the citywide average of 20%.

Ninety-one percent of residents eat some fruits and vegetables every day, which is greater than the city's average of 87%. In 2018, 79% of residents described their health as "good", "very good", or "excellent", more than the city's average of 78%. For every supermarket in Greenpoint and Williamsburg, there are 25 bodegas.

There are medical clinics in the Greenpoint area, though no hospitals are located in the neighborhood. The nearest large hospitals are Woodhull Medical Center in Bedford–Stuyvesant and Mount Sinai Queens in Astoria, Queens.

== Post office and ZIP Code ==
Greenpoint is covered by ZIP Code 11222. The United States Postal Service operates the Greenpoint Station post office at 66 Meserole Avenue.

== Education ==
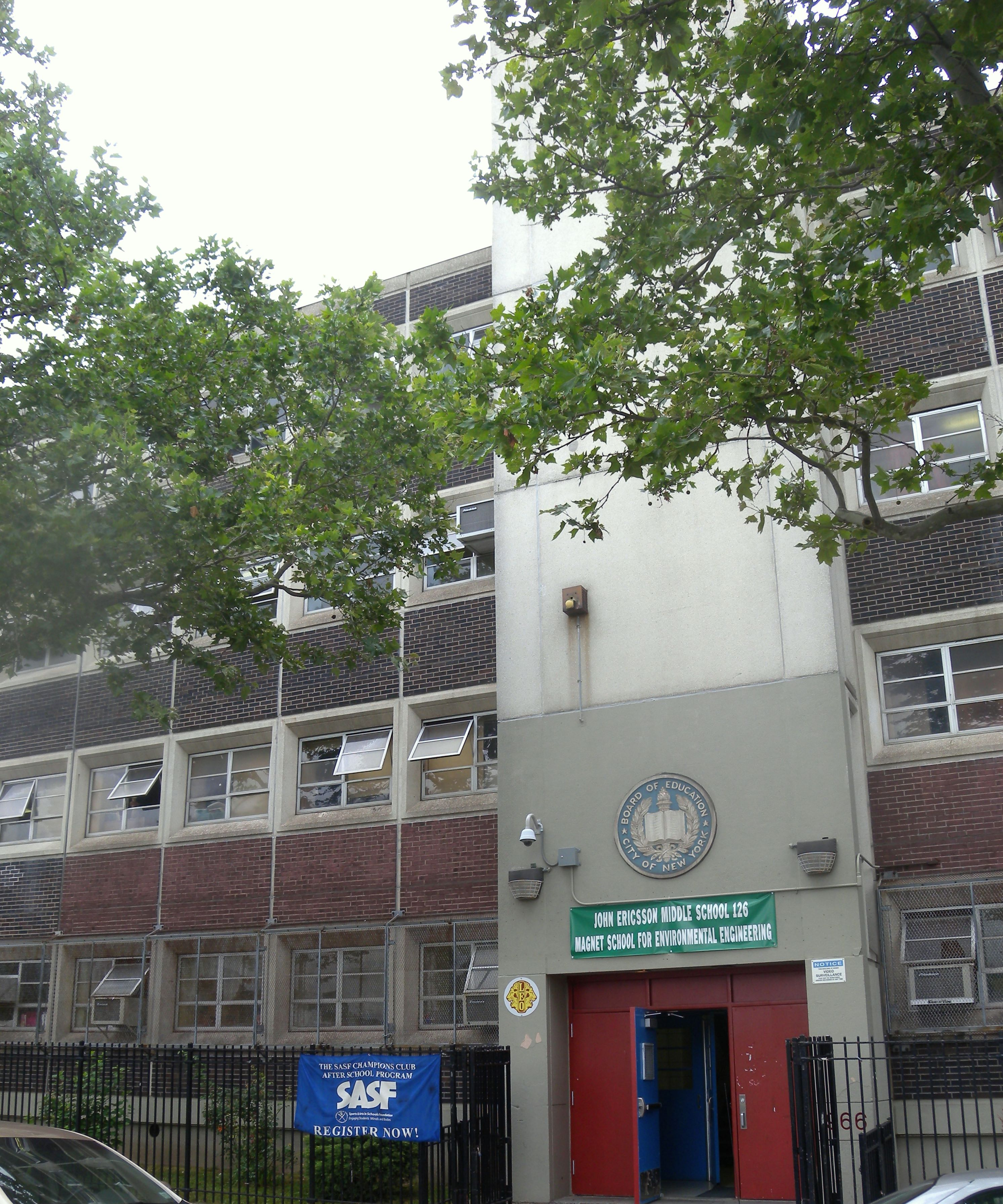
John Ericsson Middle School 126 at 424 Leonard Street, a building shared with Northside Charter High School

Greenpoint and Williamsburg generally has a higher ratio of college-educated residents than the rest of the city as of 2018. Half of the population (50%) has a college education or higher, 17% have less than a high school education and 33% are high school graduates or have some college education. By contrast, 40% of Brooklynites and 38% of city residents have a college education or higher. The percentage of Greenpoint and Williamsburg students excelling in reading and math has been increasing, with reading achievement rising from 35 percent in 2000 to 40 percent in 2011, and math achievement rising from 29 percent to 50 percent within the same time period.

Greenpoint and Williamsburg's rate of elementary school student absenteeism is slightly higher than the rest of New York City. In Greenpoint and Williamsburg, 21% of elementary school students missed twenty or more days per school year, compared to the citywide average of 20% of students. Additionally, 77% of high school students in Greenpoint and Williamsburg graduate on time, higher than the citywide average of 75% of students.

=== Schools ===
Greenpoint contains the following public elementary schools which serve grades PK–5:

- PS 31 Samuel F. Dupont
- PS 34 Oliver H. Perry
- PS 110 The Monitor

The following public middle school serves grades 6–8:

- John Ericsson Middle School 126

The following public high schools serve grades 9–12:

- Automotive High School
- Frances Perkins Academy
- Northside Charter High School

=== Library ===
The Brooklyn Public Library (BPL)'s Greenpoint branch is located at 107 Norman Avenue near Leonard Street. The site originally housed a Carnegie library that opened in 1906, but it was replaced in the 1970s. The library closed in mid-2017 for redevelopment, replacing the former branch building with a new facility called the Greenpoint Library & Environmental Education Center. The renovation and reconstruction were originally expected to be completed in late 2018, but were delayed due to construction issues. The new facility opened to the public on October 20, 2020.

== Transportation ==
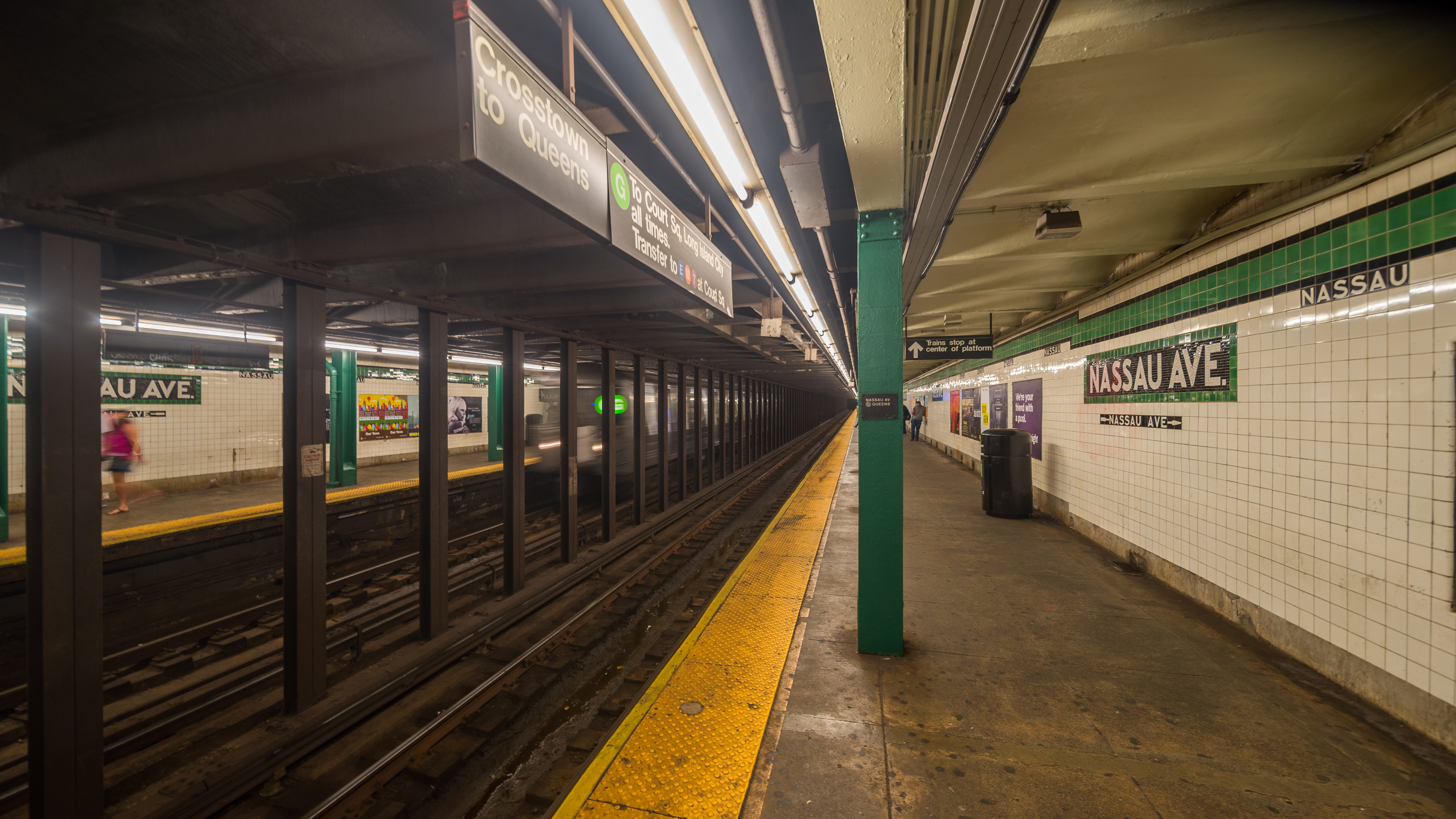
Nassau Avenue station

Greenpoint is served by the Greenpoint Avenue and Nassau Avenue stations on the IND Crosstown Line (G train) of the New York City Subway. It is served by the B24, B32, B43, B48 and B62 New York City Bus routes.

In June 2011, NY Waterway started service to points along the East River. On May 1, 2017, that route became part of the NYC Ferry's East River route, which runs between Pier 11/Wall Street in Manhattan's Financial District and the East 34th Street Ferry Landing in Murray Hill, Manhattan, with five intermediate stops in Brooklyn and Queens. Greenpoint is served by the East River Ferry's India Street stop.

A streetcar/light rail proposal known as the Brooklyn–Queens Connector (BQX) would run along the waterfront from Red Hook through Greenpoint to Astoria in Queens. In 2018, the city released a revised plan estimating the project would cost about $2.73 billion, with construction projected to begin in 2024 and be completed by 2029. In 2020, Mayor Bill de Blasio cited COVID-19-related delays and said major decisions on the project would largely fall to the next administration, leaving the timeline uncertain.

== Landmarks and attractions ==
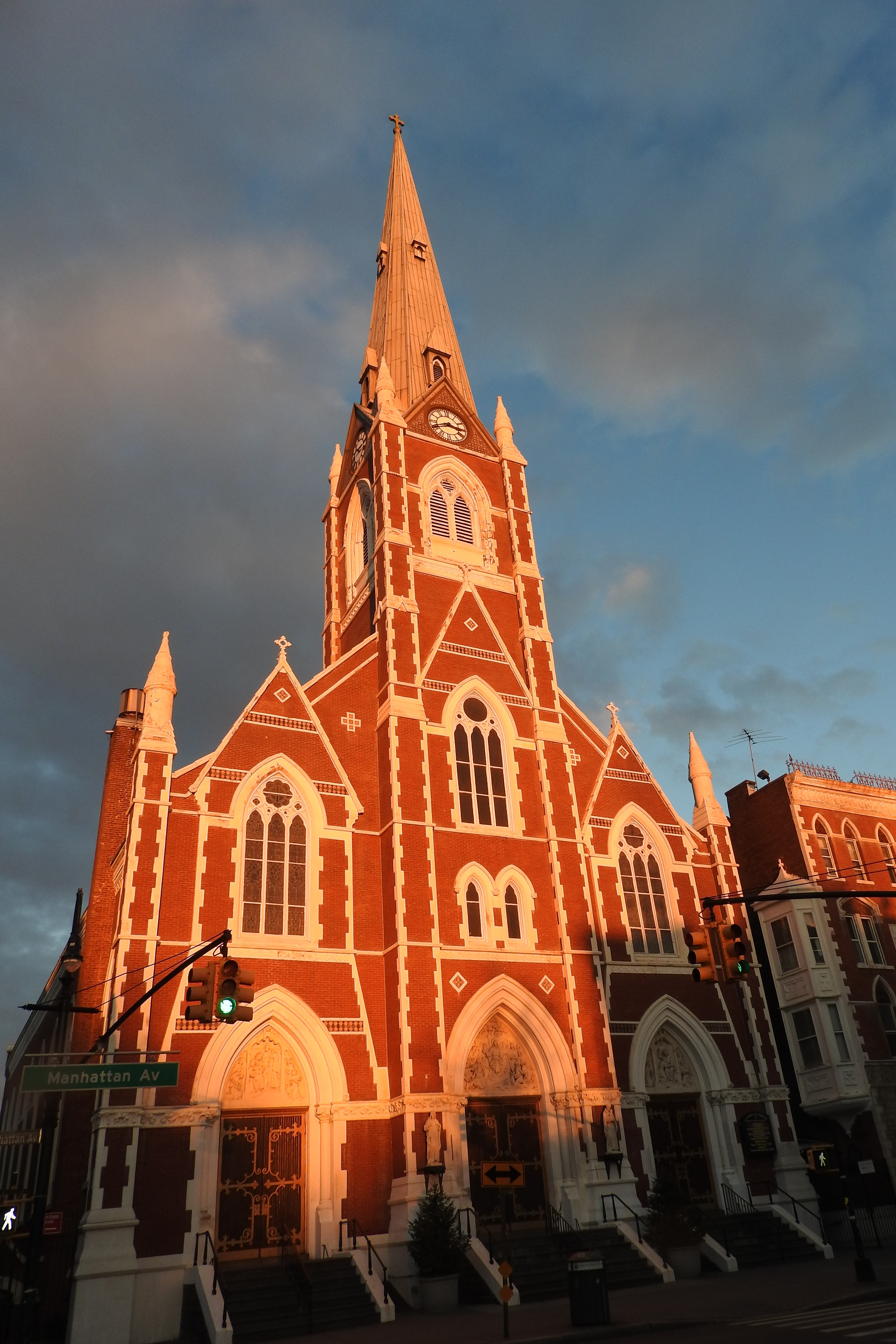
St Anthony of Padua Church

=== Street grid ===
When Neziah Bliss created Greenpoint, he named the east–west streets in alphabetical order from north to south. Originally, these streets were simply given lettered names such as "A Street" and "B Street", but in the mid-19th century, the streets were given longer names. This system persists today with a few exceptions: Ash, Box, Clay, Dupont, Eagle, Freeman, Green, Huron, India, Java, Kent, Greenpoint (Avenue), Milton, Noble, Oak, Calyer, and Quay Streets. Greenpoint Avenue was formerly named Lincoln Street. There would have been a street starting with the letter "P" between Oak and Quay Streets, but it was named Calyer Street early in Greenpoint's history, after the patriarch of a nearby family.

=== Parks ===
Parks include McCarren Park (formerly known as Greenpoint Park), the neighborhood's largest green space, and the smaller McGolrick Park (formerly known as Winthrop Park), which contains both the landmarked Shelter Pavilion (1910) and an allegorical monument to the ironclad ship USS Monitor (1938). On the East River, WNYC Transmitter Park opened in 2012 on the site of a former radio transmission antenna. A small playground called "Right Angle Park" is located at Commercial, Dupont, and Franklin Streets, so named because the park is located on a city block that is shaped like a right triangle.

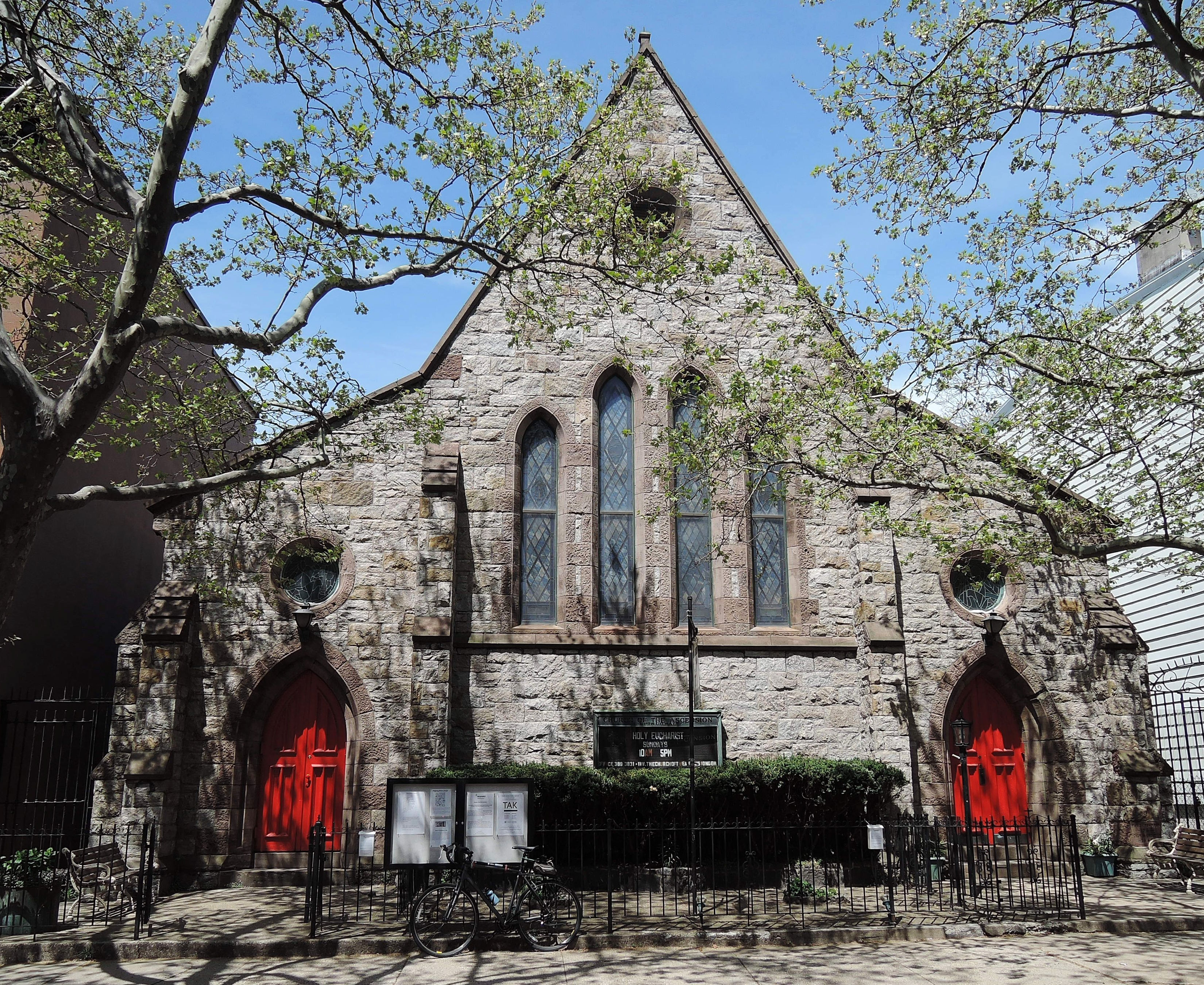
Church of the Ascension, built in 1853

=== Architectural and historic landmarks ===
The Greenpoint Historic District is roughly bounded by Kent, Calyer, Noble, and Franklin Streets, Clifford Place, Lorimer Street and Manhattan Avenue.

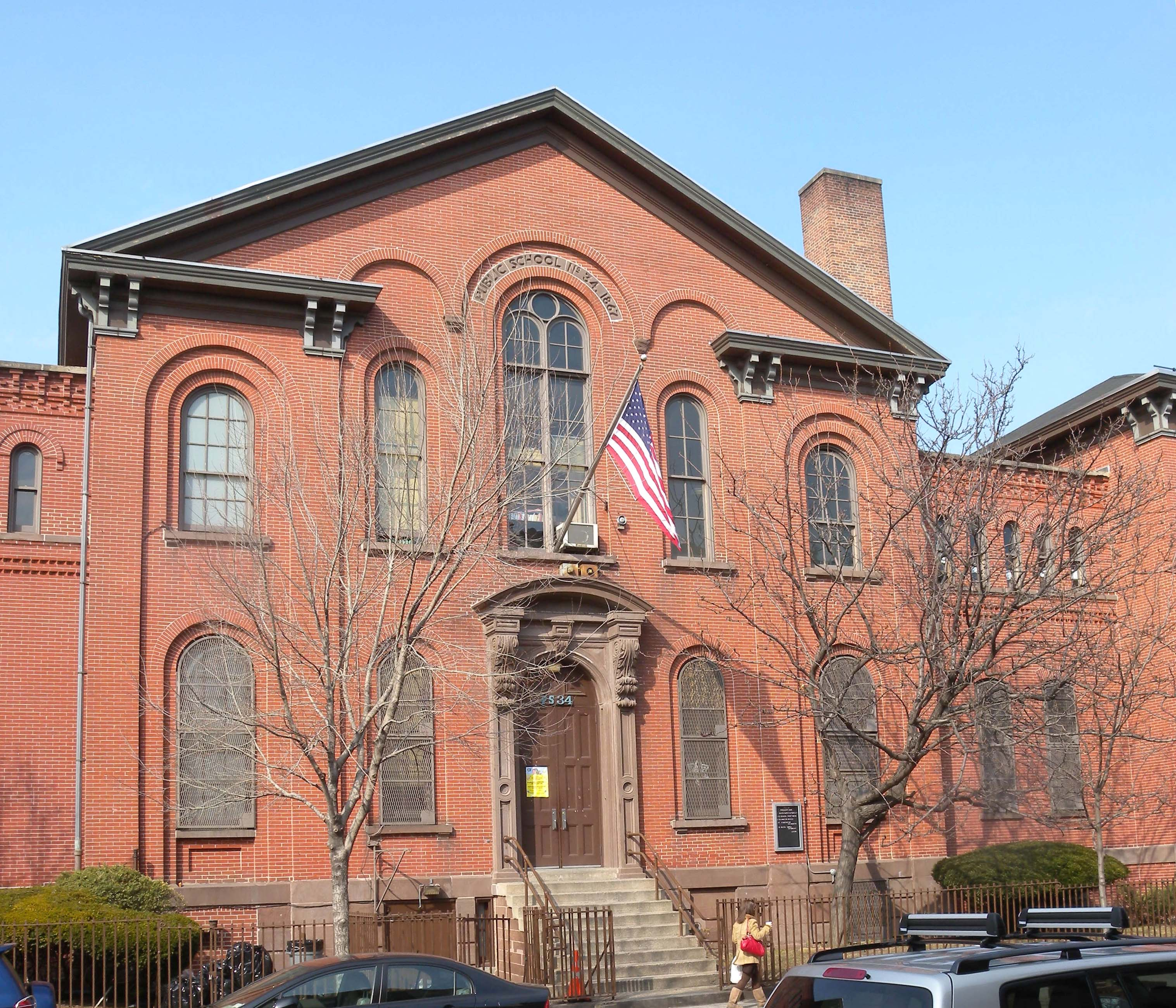
P.S. 34

Of architectural interest in Greenpoint are: the Episcopal Church of the Ascension (1853), the oldest church in Greenpoint on Kent Street; the Astral Apartments (1885) on Franklin Street; the Saint Anthony of Padua Roman Catholic Church (1875) on Manhattan Avenue; the Eberhard Faber Pencil Factory on Greenpoint Avenue at Franklin Street; the Russian Orthodox Cathedral of the Transfiguration of Our Lord (1921) on North 12th Street; PS 34, the Oliver H. Perry School (1867) on Norman Avenue (the oldest continuously operating public school building in New York City); the Capital One (formerly Green Point) Savings Bank (1908); the Saint Stanislaus Kostka Roman Catholic Church (1896) on Humboldt Street, which serves as a Catholic shrine for the Polish community; and the synagogue building of Congregation Ahavas Israel (1903) on Noble Street (the sanctuary, with stained glass windows and a Torah ark with turn of the century wood carvings, is currently open only during services on Saturday mornings).

A commercial building called Keramos Hall, on Manhattan Avenue, was restored and won a Lucy G. Moses Preservation Award from the New York Landmarks Conservancy in 2013. The conservancy wrote: "Picturesque features had been hidden under asbestos shingles for decades, but when owners discovered a vintage photograph, they began putting funds aside for this work. Now, the revelation of the Stick Style façade, Italianate roof tower, and Swiss Chalet brackets stops passersby in their tracks." The Kickstarter headquarters, located in Greenpoint, is housed in the former Eberhart Faber Pencil Factory on Kent Street, which was renovated in 2013–2014. The restoration received a Moses Preservation Award as well as a MASterworks Award from the Municipal Art Society.

St. Cecilia's Roman Catholic Church and School, on Monitor Street between Richardson and Herbert Streets, has served the community since 1871. The school, which dates to 1906, was closed in June 2008. The current church building dates to 1891.

== Notable people ==
Notable individuals who were born in or lived in Greenpoint include:

- Awkwafina (born 1988), rapper and actress
- Pat Benatar (born 1953), pop singer
- Ralph Albert Blakelock (1847–1919), painter
- Margaret Wise Brown (1910–1952), children's book author who wrote Goodnight Moon and The Runaway Bunny
- Kieran Culkin (born 1982), actor
- Bull Dempsey (born 1988), professional wrestler
- Joseph Di Prisco (born 1950), poet, novelist, memoirist, book reviewer and teacher
- John Franzese (1917–2020), mobster
- Jack Houghteling, novelist.
- Charles Evans Hughes (1862–1948), statesman, politician and jurist who served as the 11th Chief Justice of the United States from 1930 to 1941
- John Mulvany (c. 1839–1906), artist best known for his paintings of the American West.
- Mickey Rooney (1920–2014), actor
- Mae West (1893–1980), actress

== In popular culture ==
Greenpoint is a popular filming location for New York TV and film productions due to its varied architecture, waterfront access, mixed zoning and relatively low street traffic, and because it is also the primary home of two of New York's film and TV stage companies, Broadway Stages, and CineMagic Studios. Several TV shows house their permanent soundstages in the neighborhood's industrial area between Greenpoint Avenue and Norman Avenue east of McGuinness Boulevard.

Television

- The HBO show How to Make It in America has a character who lives in Greenpoint: Ben Epstein.
- The HBO series Girls
- MTV's I Just Want My Pants Back
- The animated series Lucas Brothers Moving Company.
- The main boardwalk set for Boardwalk Empire – a show about Atlantic City, New Jersey – was built on the Greenpoint waterfront, until it was exploded as part of the plotline in season three of the series.
- Rescue Me was filmed in a warehouse in Greenpoint and on the neighborhood's streets.
- The Black Donnellys was also filmed in a warehouse in Greenpoint and on the neighborhood's streets.
- Lipstick Jungle was also filmed in a warehouse in Greenpoint and on the neighborhood's streets.
- Third Watch
- Person of Interest
- Fringe
- Ray Donovan
- Stella
- Life on Mars
- Lie to Me
- The Good Wife
- Blue Bloods, which has a studio on Greenpoint Avenue
- Law and Order: Special Victims Unit
- Homeland
- The Punisher
- Daredevil
- Unbreakable Kimmy Schmidt

Films

- The park scene in Going In Style, the original with George Burns, Art Carney, and Lee Strasberg, was filmed in McGolrick Park in Greenpoint.
- Donnie Brasco, based in part on Greenpoint native Dominick "Sonny Black" Napolitano
- The Sitter
- Anger Management
- The Departed
- Sleepers
- Dead Presidents
- All Is Bright
- Romeo Is Bleeding
- In the Mix
- Street Trash
- The Siege
- On the Waterfront: An early cultural reference to Greenpoint is found in the first minutes of the film, in which a minor gangster, after holding back money from Johnny Friendly, is told to "go back to Greenpoint."
- The Meyerowitz Stories

Music videos

- The scene of Jay-Z playing basketball against LeBron James in "D.O.A. (Death of Auto-Tune)" was filmed here.
- Jedi Mind Tricks's "Heavy Metal Kings"
- The Roots's "Clones"
- Charlie Puth's "We Don't Talk Anymore"

Other

- The lead singer of Franz Ferdinand, Alex Kapranos, lived for a time in Greenpoint, and the neighborhood is mentioned in the song "Eleanor Put Your Boots On".
- Greenpoint hosts New York City's Nuit Blanche festival. The first two festivals were held along the neighborhood's waterfront in 2010 and 2011, and it was held in a Greenpoint event space in 2012.
- The book series The Mortal Instruments has a main character named Magnus Bane who resides there.
- The neighborhood is the location of a memoir by Tommy Carbone.

== See also ==
- Greenpoint Renaissance Enterprise Corporation
