= Union Porcelain Works =

American manufacturer of porcelain wares

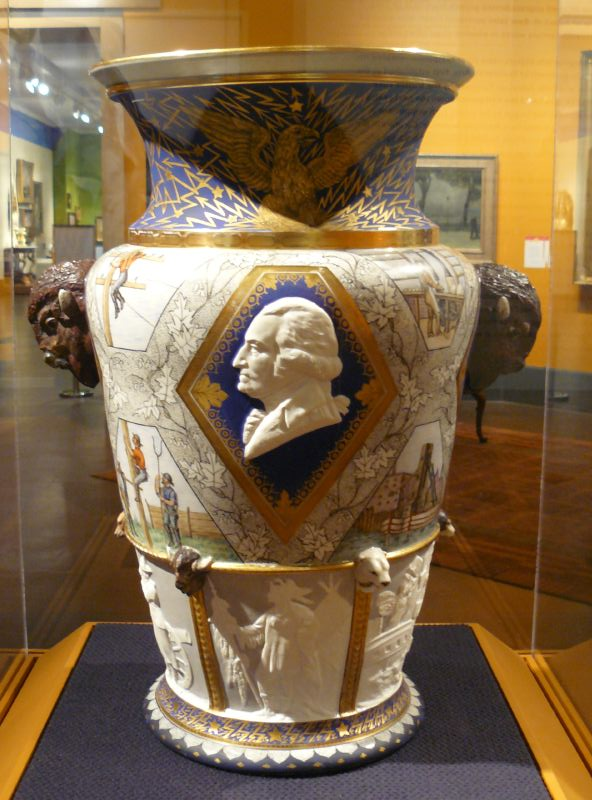
The Union Porcelain Works' Century Vase, as exhibited in the 1876 Centennial Exposition

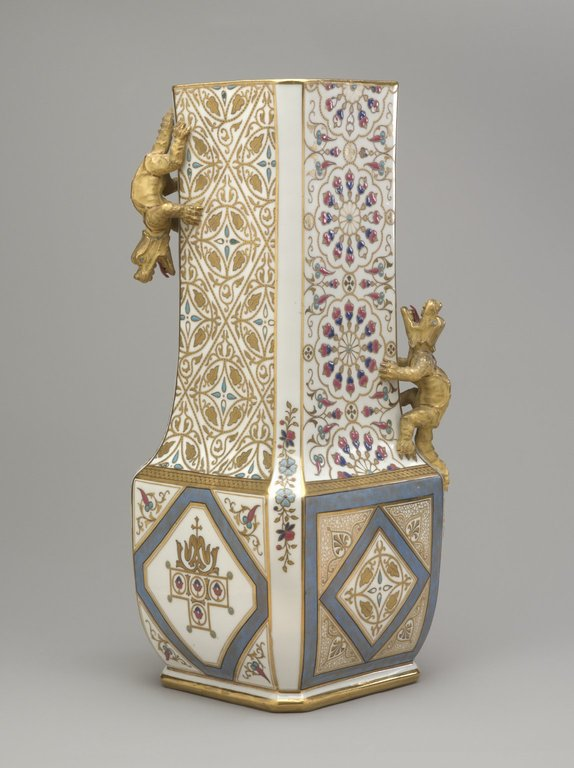
Vase, ca. 1884. Brooklyn Museum

The Union Porcelain Works was both the first and the foremost American manufacturer of porcelain wares from c. 1862 to c. 1922, with its factory located in Greenpoint, now a part of Brooklyn, New York.

The company's history traces back to c. 1844 when William Boch & Brothers began to make soft-paste porcelain (a mixture of kaolin and phosphate of lime, after an English formula) in a single kiln. By 1850 their enterprise was organized under several names including the Union Porcelain Works and Empire Porcelain Works. The brothers proved unsuccessful, and their factory passed into the hands of a stock company, who succeeded in inducing Thomas Carll Smith (1815–1901), then a prosperous architect and builder in New York, to loan them considerable sums of money in 1859. The war came on, the company failed, and in 1862 Smith found himself obliged to take the factory for his debt.

In 1863, Smith visited the Manufacture nationale de Sèvres in France and English potteries in Stoke-on-Trent, during which visit he became determined to switch to the manufacture of hard-paste porcelain. He thus became the first American to make true porcelain. He reworked the factory tools accordingly at a cost of $250,000, and purchased a quarry in Branchville, Connecticut, to supply the necessary quartz and feldspar. After two years of experiment, he began to sell a small quantity of his porcelain.

From 1864 to 1869, the firm was known as Thomas C. Smith and Company, but the factory itself continued to be called the Union Porcelain Works. In its first decade, its products were limited to sturdy white china plates and dishes for the hotel trade, electrical insulators, hardware trimming, and decorated tiles. However, in 1874, in preparation for the Centennial Exposition, Smith hired sculptor Karl L. H. Müller (c. 1820–1887) as the company's chief designer. Mueller then created a wide range of designs for porcelain pieces, most notably the Century Vase which was exhibited at the Centennial Exposition. John Mackie Falconer also created designs for the company.

By 1917, the firm employed more than 200 persons in a factory nearly the size of a city block. Its kilns were huge cylindrical structures, 15 feet in diameter, and 20 feet in height, with brick walls more than 3 feet thick. When fired, a kiln used about 10 tons of coal for one firing, with combustion continued for 30 to 35 hours. About 30,000 to 60,000 pieces of ware were included in one firing.

The company appears to have ceased operations in 1922.
