= Brooklyn Community Board 1 =

Brooklyn Community District 1
- Community District
- Country: United States
- State: New York
- City: New York City
- Borough: Brooklyn
- Neighborhoods: List: Greenpoint; Williamsburg

Government
  - Chair: Dealice Fuller
  - District Manager: Gerald A. Esposito

Area
  - Total: 4.7 sq mi (12 km^{2})

Population (2020)
  - Total: 204,125 ▲
  - Density: 43,000/sq mi (17,000/km^{2})

Ethnicity
  - White: 60.9%
  - Hispanic and Latino (any race): 22.3%
  - Asian: 6.7%
  - Black: 5.2%
  - Others: 4.9%
- Time zone: UTC−5 (Eastern)
  - Summer (DST): UTC−4 (EDT)
- ZIP codes: 11206, 11211, 11222
- Area code: 718, 347, 929, and 917
- Police Precincts: 90th (website); 94th (website)
- Website: www1.nyc.gov/site/Brooklyncb1/index.page

Brooklyn Community Board 1 is a New York City community board that encompasses the Brooklyn neighborhoods of Williamsburg and Greenpoint. It is delimited by the Newtown Creek and Queens Borough line on the east, Flushing and Kent Avenue on the south, and by the East River on the west.

Its current chairman is Dealice Fuller, and its district manager is Johana Pulgarin.

As of the United States Census, 2000, the Community Board had a population of 160,338, up from 155,972 in 1990 and 142,942 in 1980. Of them (as of 2000), 77,040 (48.0%) were White non-Hispanic, 8,808 (5.5%) were African-American, 5,730 (3.57%) were Asian or Pacific Islander, 192 (0.1%) were American Indian or Native Alaskan, 3,635 (2.3%) were of some other race, 4,488 (2.8%) were of two or more races, and 60,445 (37.7%) were Hispanic.

46.7% of the population benefit from public assistance as of 2004, up from 32.9% in 2000.

The land area is 3,167.6 acres (12.819 km^{2}).

The community board maintains a housing committee.

== Demographics ==
Historical population
Census	Pop.	Note	%±
1980	142,942		—
1990	155,972		9.1%
2000	160,338		2.8%
2010	173,083		7.9%
2020	204,125		17.9%
U.S. Decennial Census

Brooklyn Community Board 1 recorded a population of 204,125 in the 2020 United States census, a 18% increase since the 2010 United States census, when the figure stood at 173,083.

Population by race as of 2010 and 2020 censuses:
Race	2010		2020	
White	105,311	60.84%	124,282	60.88%
Asian	8,711	5.03%	13,631	6.67%
Black	8,982	5.19%	10,692	5.24%
Other	859	0.50%	2,956	1.45%
Multiracial	2,212	1.28%	7,088	3.47%
Hispanic (any race)	47,008	27.16%	45,476	22.28%
Total	173,083	100%	204,125	100%
