= Libchavy =

- Municipality
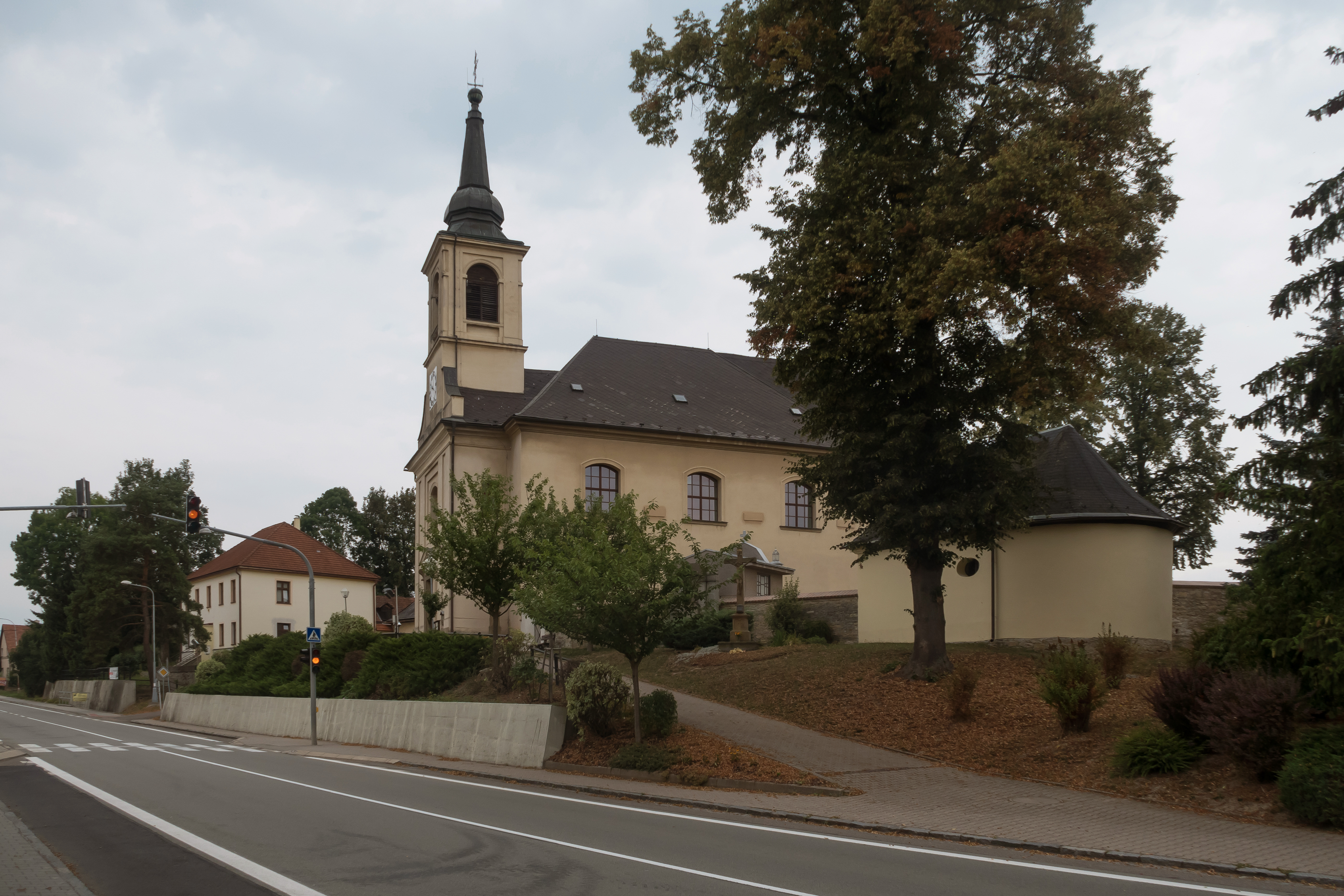
- Church of Saint Nicholas

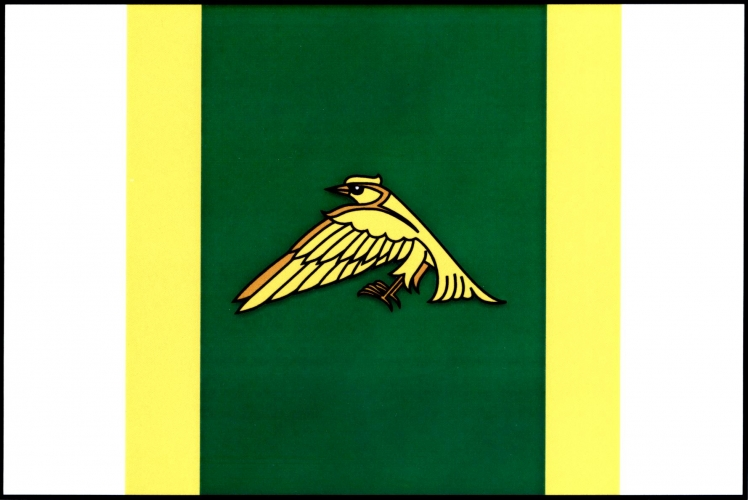
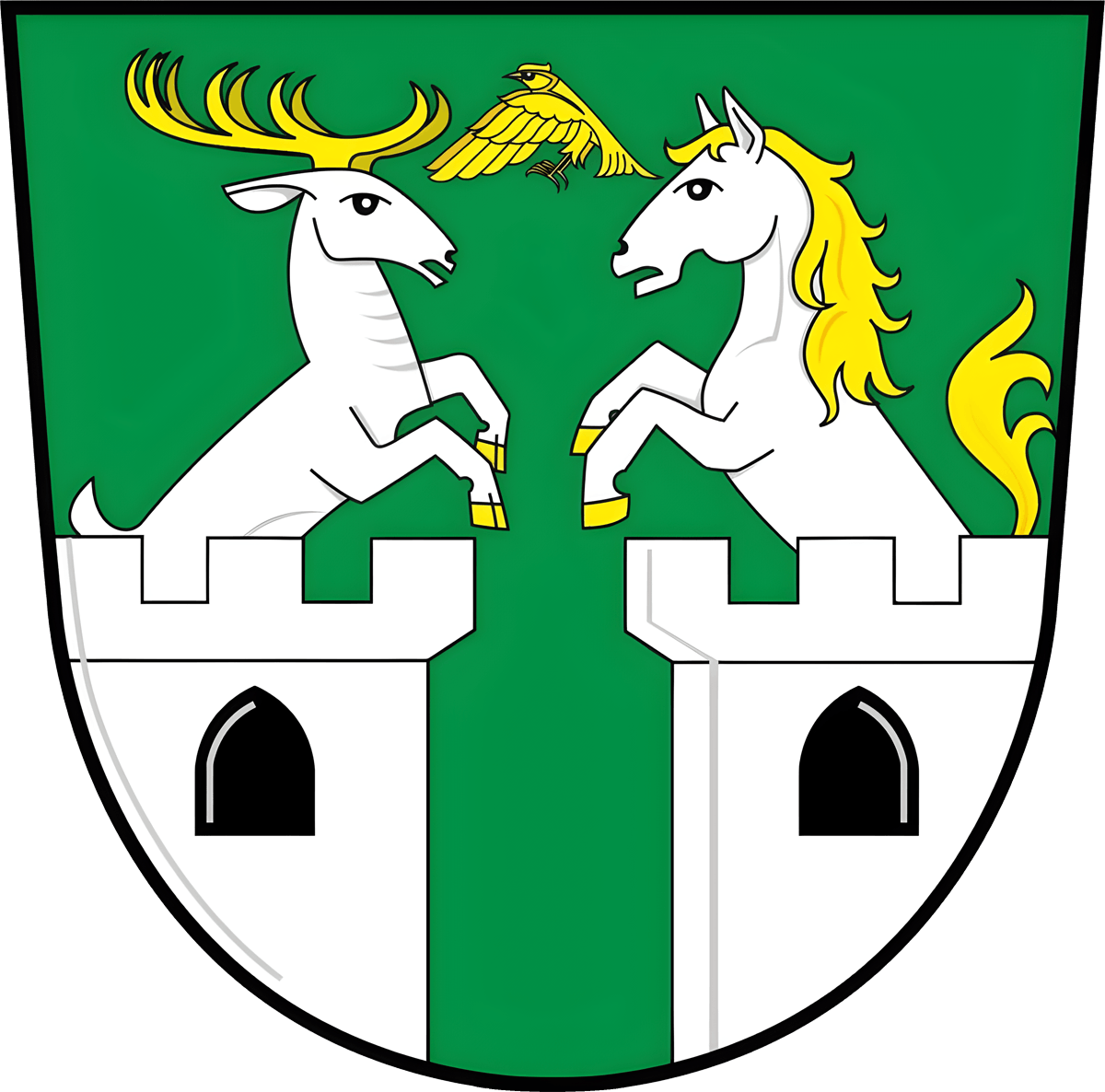
- Flag Coat of arms

- Location in the Czech Republic
- Coordinates: 50°0′12″N 16°23′23″E
- Country: Czech Republic
- Region: Pardubice
- District: Ústí nad Orlicí
- First mentioned: 1336

Area
  - Total: 22.11 km^{2} (8.54 sq mi)
- Elevation: 345 m (1,132 ft)

Population (2026-01-01)
  - Total: 1,815
  - Density: 82.09/km^{2} (212.6/sq mi)
- Time zone: UTC+1 (CET)
  - Summer (DST): UTC+2 (CEST)
- Postal code: 561 16
- Website: www.libchavy.cz

Libchavy (German: Lichwe) is a municipality in Ústí nad Orlicí District in the Pardubice Region of the Czech Republic. It has about 1,800 inhabitants.

== Administrative division ==
Libchavy consists of two municipal parts (in brackets population according to the 2021 census):

- Dolní Libchavy (978)
- Horní Libchavy (756)

== Etymology ==
The initial name of the village was in singular – Libchava (in Old Czech written as Ľubchava). The name was derived from the Czech adjective libý (ľubý), meaning 'nice', 'pleasant', and the suffix -ava used for watercourses. The names Dolní Libchavy and Horní Libchavy mean 'lower Libchavy' and 'upper Libchavy'. When the village was founded, it was called Německá Libchava (Německé Libchavy; 'German Libchavy') to distinguish it from the nearby village of České Libchavy ('Bohemian Libchavy').

== Geography ==
Libchavy is located about 2 kilometres (1 mi) north of Ústí nad Orlicí and 42 km (26 mi) east of Pardubice. It lies in the Svitavy Uplands. The highest point is at 526 m (1,726 ft) above sea level. The elongated built-up area is located in the valley of the stream Libchavský potok.

== History ==
The first written mention of the Libchavy area is from 1227, when there was a forested area called Na Lubhave. The first written mention of the Libchavy village is from 1360. The village was founded during the colonisation between 1265 and 1285. It was initially called Německé Libchavy was later divided into three villages: Dolní Libchavy, Horní Libchavy and Prostřední Libchavy. Prostřední Libchavy was later absorbed by Horní Libchavy. In 1976, Dolní Libchavy and Horní Libchavy were merged into one municipality.

Until 1945, Libchavy was predominantly a German-speaking municipality, but most of the inhabitants could also speak Czech and a specific German dialect arose here. After World War II, most of the German population was expelled and the municipality was partly resettled by Czechs.

== Demographics ==
Historical population

Year	Pop.	±%
1869	2,353	—
1880	2,324	−1.2%
1890	2,342	+0.8%
1900	2,198	−6.1%
1910	2,089	−5.0%

Year	Pop.	±%
1921	1,900	−9.0%
1930	1,884	−0.8%
1950	1,350	−28.3%
1961	1,437	+6.4%
1970	1,329	−7.5%

Year	Pop.	±%
1980	1,354	+1.9%
1991	1,431	+5.7%
2001	1,562	+9.2%
2011	1,645	+5.3%
2021	1,734	+5.4%

Source: Censuses

== Economy ==
Since 1991, Libchavy has been home to the major bus manufacturer SOR Libchavy.

== Transport ==
The I/14 road (the section from Ústí nad Orlicí to Rychnov nad Kněžnou) passes through the municipality.

Dolní Libchavy is located on the railway line Ústí nad Orlicí–Moravský Karlov.

== Sights ==
The main landmark of the municipality is the Church of Saint Nicholas, located in Dolní Libchavy. It was built in the Empire style in 1803 according to the design by Joseph Hardtmuth. It replaced an older Renaissance church, destroyed by fire. The interior is decorated with frescoes by Josef Matyáš Trenkwald from the end of the 19th century.
