= Hardtmuth =

Hardtmuth is a surname. Notable people with the surname include:

- Joseph Hardtmuth (1758–1816), Austrian architect, inventor and entrepreneur
- Paul Hardtmuth (1888–1962), British actor
