= Carpenter pencil =

Pencil designed for use by carpenters

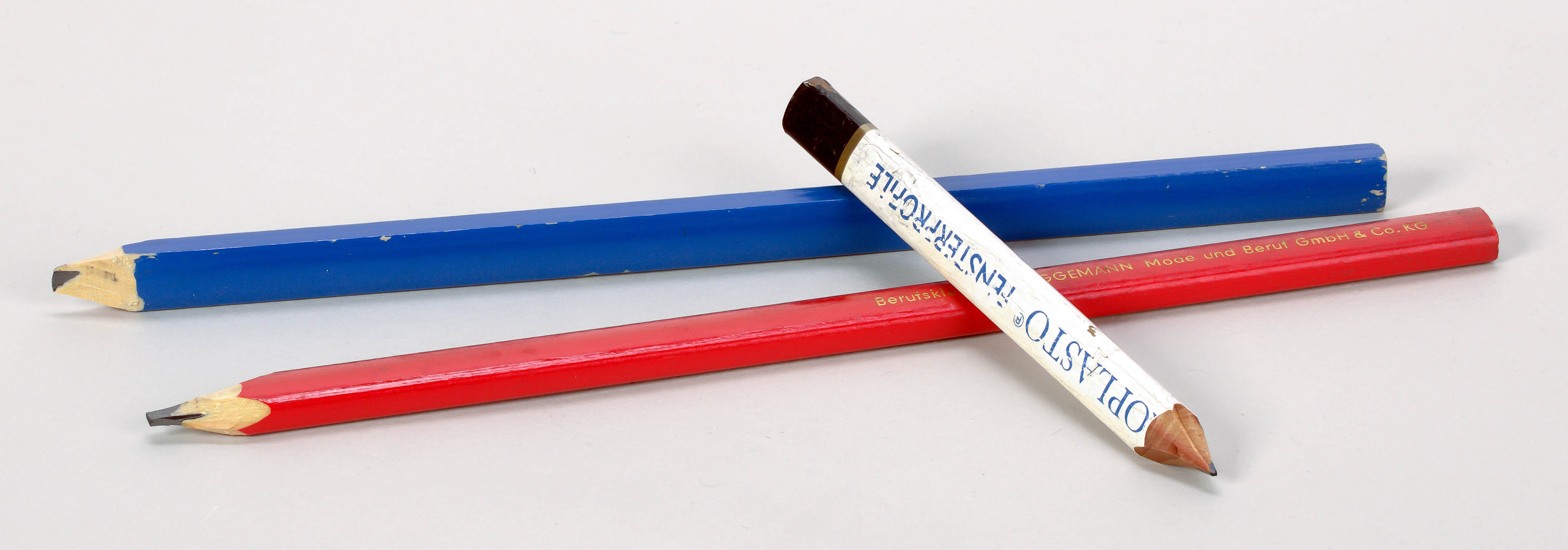
- Different models of carpenter pencils
- Type: Pencil
- Inception: c. 1560; 466 years ago
- Manufacturer: C.H. Hanson; Musgrave
- Available: Yes

A carpenter pencil (carpentry pencil, carpenter's pencil) is a pencil that has a body with a rectangular or elliptical cross-section to allow it to be used as a quick reference to 1/4 and 1/2 inch measurements (15mm and 7.5mm in metric versions). The shape also helps prevent it from rolling away as a secondary function.

Carpenter pencils are easier to grip than standard pencils, because they have a larger surface area. Some of the companies producing this type of pencil are C.H. Hanson and Musgrave Pencil Company.

== Overview ==
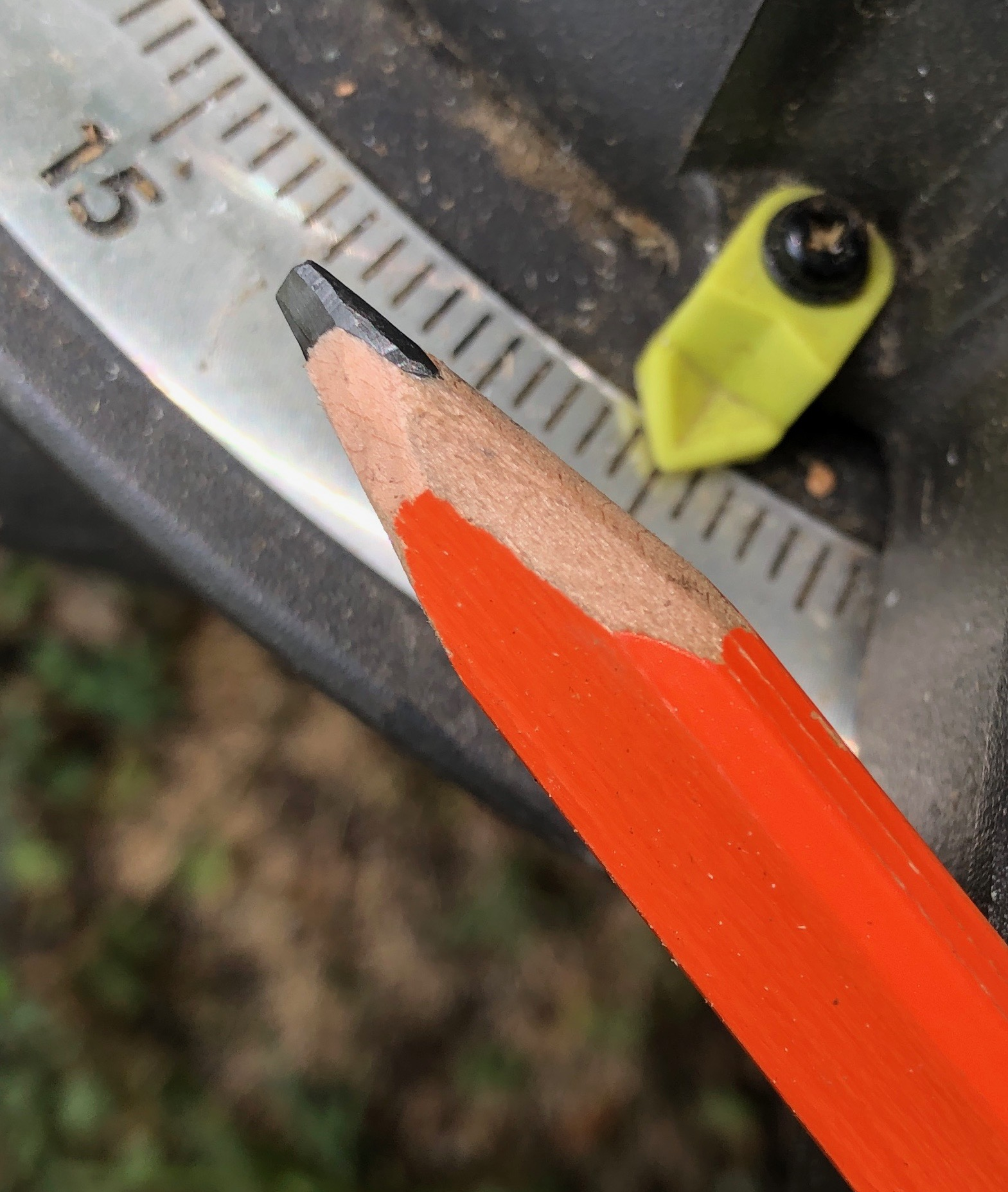
Carpenter's pencil on the job

The non-round core allows thick or thin lines to be made by holding the pencil slightly rotated, particularly useful in carpentry where thin lines are required for high precision markings and are easy to erase, but thick markings are needed to mark rough surfaces.

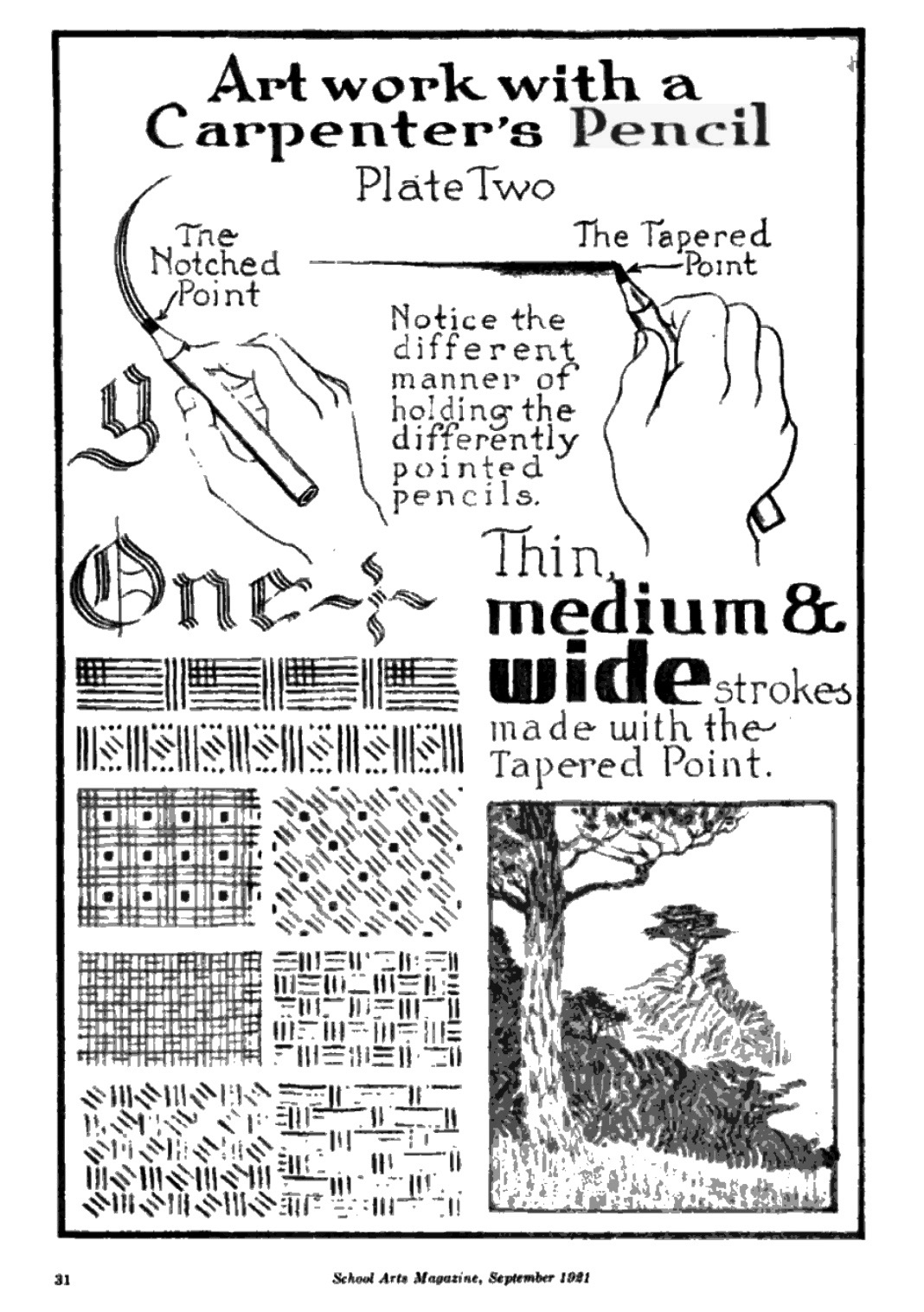
Artwork with carpenter's pencil (published 1921), including an illustration of how Old English letters are easier to draw with a notched carpenter pencil than with an ordinary pen

The pencil is robust and strong to endure heavy duty environments like a tool box, construction site, or carpentry shop. The core is typically stronger than in other pencils. As such, carpenter pencils are often used by builders because they can mark on surfaces like concrete or stone. The shape and lead density aid in marking legible lines with a straight edge that are clear and easy to follow with a saw blade.

Carpenter pencils are typically manually sharpened with a knife, although special sharpeners can be used.

The earliest versions of the flat pencil were made in around 1560 by hollowing out sticks of juniper wood, then pushing the graphite through the channel. By the 1660s the technique had been refined: two wooden halves were carved with a groove running down them, a plumbago stick placed in one of the grooves, and the two halves then glued together—essentially the same method in use to this day.

Carpenter pencils are sometimes used for their artistic practicality, as they allow artists to draw either a thick or a thin line easily with the same tool. Additionally, the width of the pencil makes it possible to notch the graphite core enabling the user to draw two parallel lines at once, a technique used by artists and calligraphers.
