= Copying pencil =

Pencil whose lead contains a dye

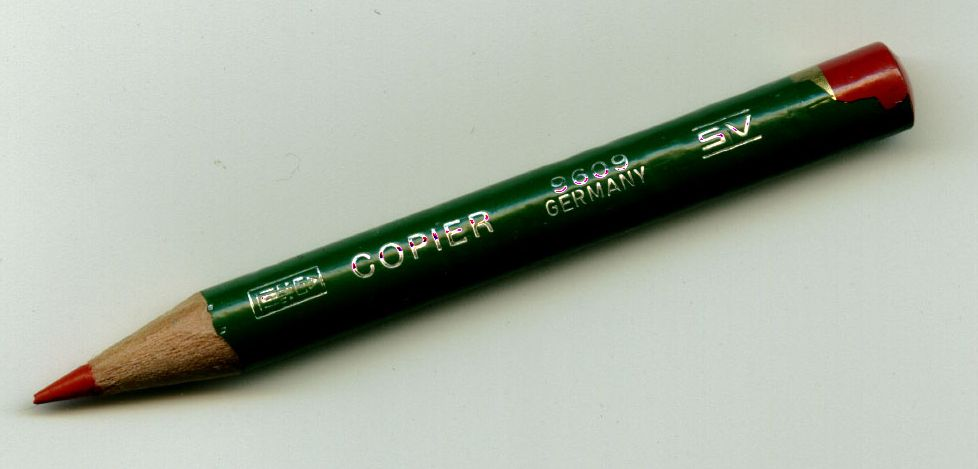
- Type: Pencil
- Inception: 1870s; 155 years ago
- Manufacturer: Faber-Castell; Eberhard Faber; Koh-i-Noor Hardtmuth; Staedtler
- Available: Yes

A copying pencil, also an indelible pencil or chemical pencil, is a pencil whose lead contains a dye. The lead is fabricated by adding a dry water-soluble permanent dye to powdered graphite—used in standard graphite pencils—before binding the mixture with clay.

== History ==
Copying pencils were introduced in the 1870s and were originally marketed for copying documents, especially for making permanent copies of a permanent original. This was achieved by creating a hand-written document using a copying pencil, laying a moist tissue paper over the document and pressing it down with a mechanical press. The water-soluble dye in the writing would be transferred in its mirror image to the tissue paper, which could then be read in verso by holding it up to a light source. According to paper conservator Liz Dube, "By the 1870s, letter copying books became the ubiquitous copying tool for businesses. These volumes contained hundreds of leaves of thin tissue paper, often high quality Japanese papers, bound together for the purpose of bearing copies of outgoing correspondence and other business documents."

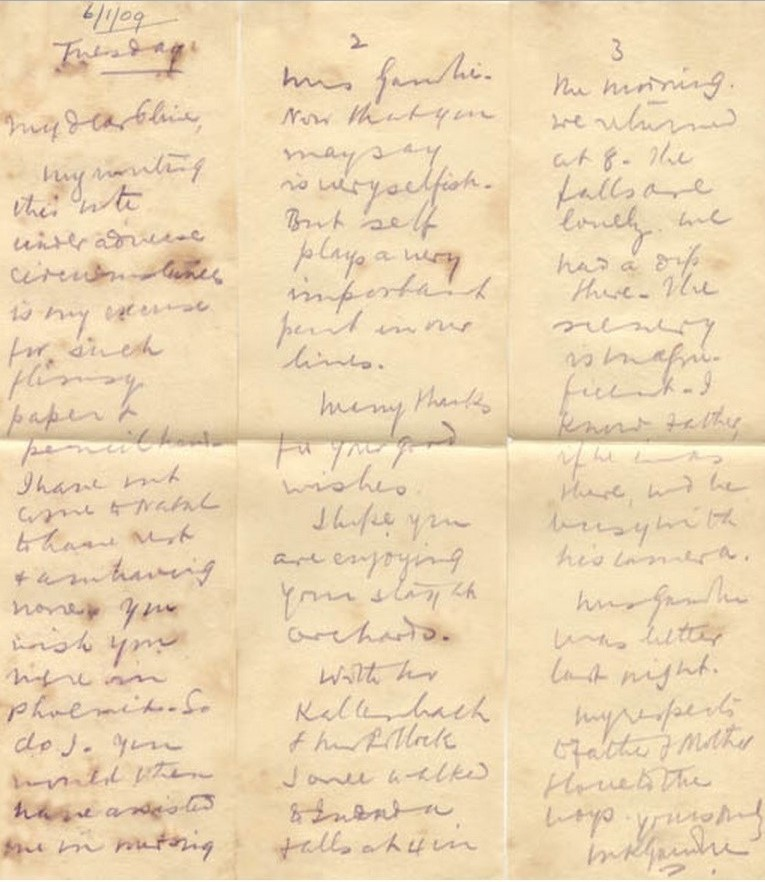
A letter written with an indelible pencil by Mohandas Karamchand Gandhi in Natal, South Africa, on 6 January 1909 to a friend, Olive Doke, mentioning Mrs. Gandhi's illness and a trip to Inanda Falls

The most commonly used dye was aniline, which produced a stain that was bright purple, mauve, or some color in between, depending upon the manufacturer. Since the aniline dye was poisonous to humans, many injuries and illness related to copying pencils were reported in the medical literature, especially in the late-19th and early-20th centuries.

By the end of the 19th century, better copying methods had become available. Consequently, the copying pencil was being used as an indelible pencil, a precursor to the ball-point pen. When used dry, it left a slightly purplish gray mark on paper, not dissimilar to a lead pencil's, but which could not be erased. When used wet, its tip moistened repeatedly by water or saliva, it produced a bright purple writing. The copying pencil served as a convenient substitute for the fountain-pen: it could be carried on one's person without need for ink or fear of leaks. Furthermore, for producing copies using carbon paper, copying pencils were considered superior to both ordinary pencils (whose writing in the original could be erased) and fountain-pens (whose nibs could not always withstand the pressure needed to produce the carbon-copy).

Copying pencils saw extended use in World War I in the completion of a wide range of paperwork. However, with the advent of refined ball-point pen technology in the 1930s, their use gradually died off in much of the world. They saw longer use in some places. In countries like India and the Soviet Union, they were commonly used for writing addresses on registered mail parcels, which were required by law to be wrapped in cloth—usually plain white or unbleached calico—and secured with twine and sealing wax. For writing an address on cloth, a moistened copying pencil was preferred to a pen, whose nib could easily get caught in the weave. During their heyday, copying pencils were also associated, across the world, with the image of a railway conductor, who famously carried one tucked behind an ear.

== Modern uses ==
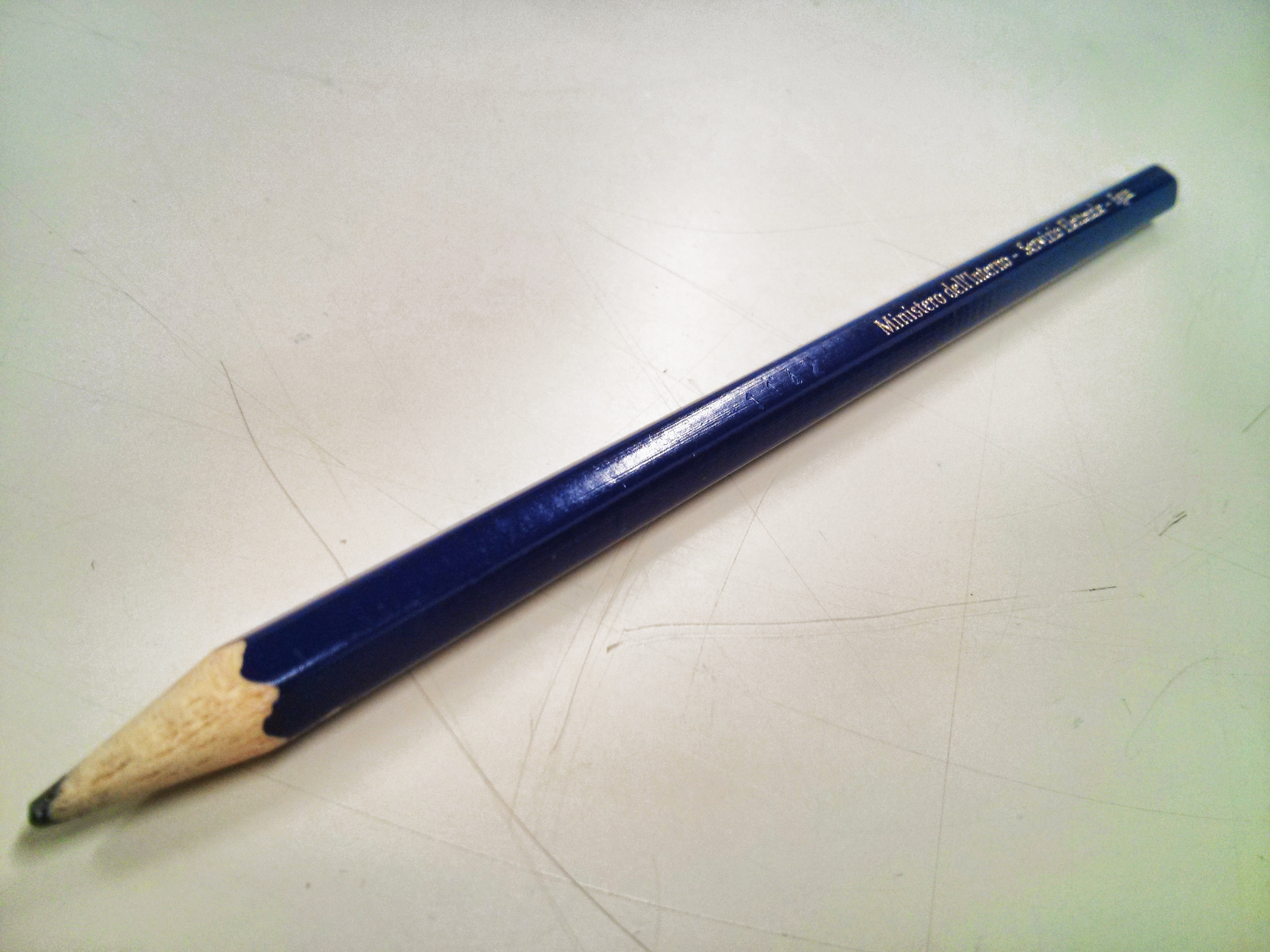
An Italian copy pencil used in elections

In Italy and other countries, their use is still mandated by law for voting paper ballots in elections and referendums. The signs written with copying pencil cannot be tampered with, without leaving clear traces on the paper.

== Health risks ==
Indelible pencils were the cause of significant health risks due to the presence of aniline dyes. Exposure to aniline dyes could lead to eczema, acne and carcinoma. Penetration of the dye from the pencil lead into the body commonly leads to severe and debilitating effects such as fever, anaemia, elevated white cell count, gastro-intestinal upset, kidney and liver damage, anorexia and necrosis of the tissue surrounding the wound. Such risks are not associated with ordinary graphite pencils. While these symptoms may appear after a couple of days they often develop only after weeks have passed since the injury was sustained. Surgery is required to remove the dye and the infected tissue and "the necrotizing action may be so severe and extensive amputation is necessary".
