= P&P Office Waste Paper Processor =

The P&P Office Waste Paper Processor is a device that recycles paper into pencils by rolling and compressing paper around a piece of pencil lead with a small amount of adhesive. The device was designed by Chinese inventors Chengzhu Ruan, Yuanyuan Liu, Xinwei Yuan, and Chao Chen.

== Design ==
The P&P Office Waste Paper Processor has been described by HowStuffWorks as looking like "a three-hole punch crossed with an electric pencil sharpener". The device receives paper via a slot in the side.
