= Pencil =

Writing implement

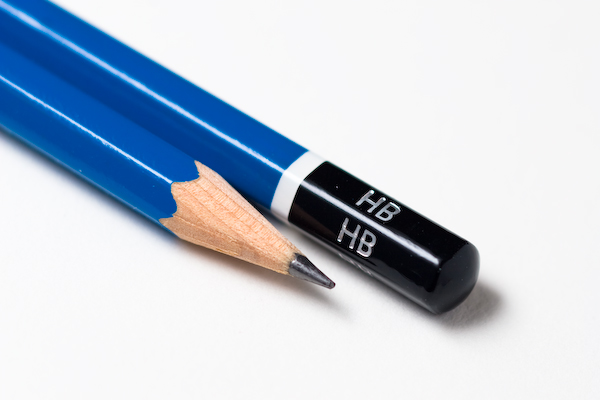
Staedtler HB graphite pencils

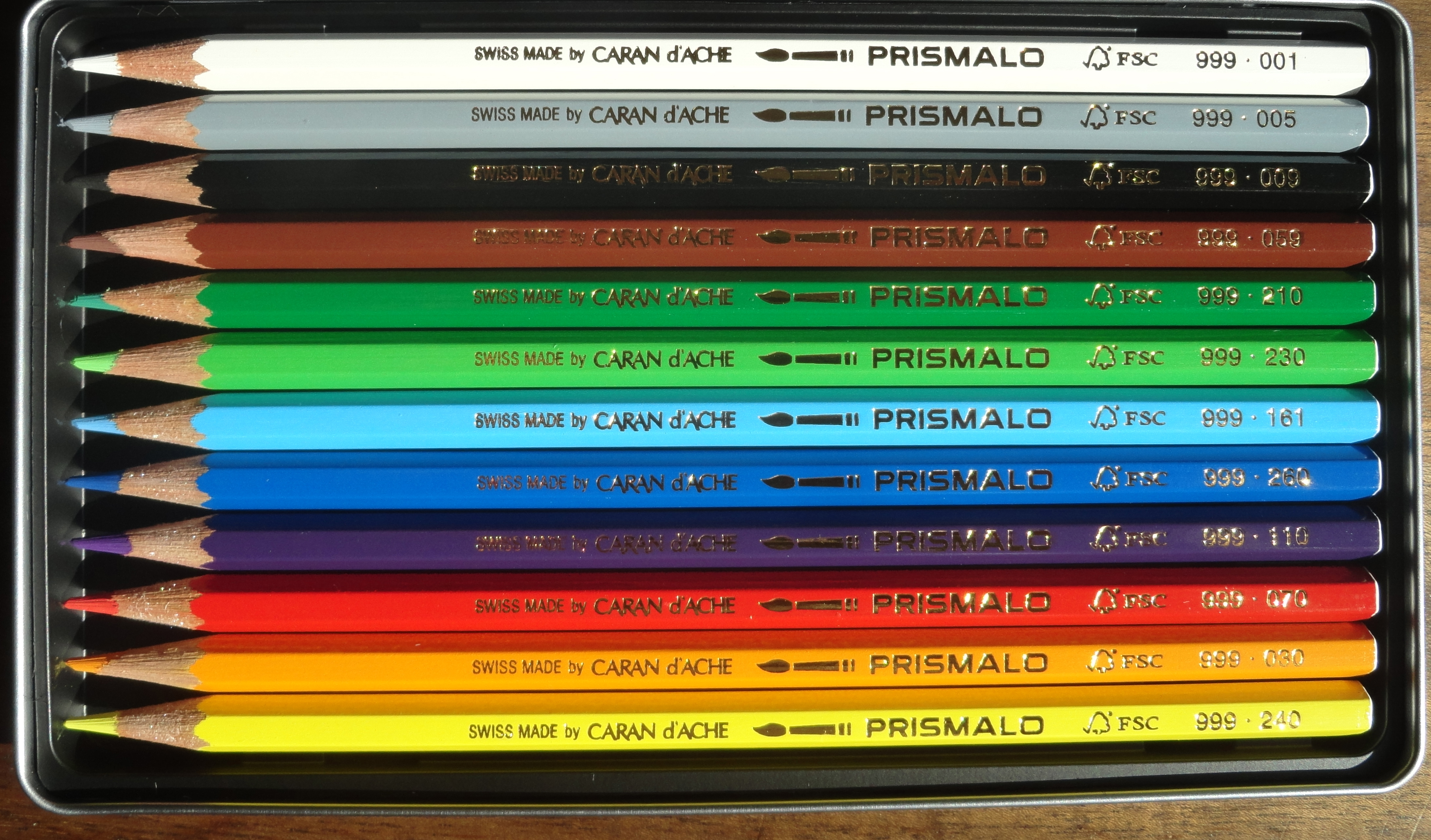
Coloured pencils (Caran d'Ache)

A typical modern-day pencil.: 1. Solid pigment core (typically graphite, commonly called pencil lead); 2. Wood; 3. Painted body; 4. Ferrule; 5. Eraser

A pencil (/ˈpɛnsəl/) is a writing or drawing implement with a solid pigment core in a protective casing that reduces the risk of core breakage and keeps it from marking the user's hand.

Pencils create marks by physical abrasion, leaving a trail of solid core material that adheres to a sheet of paper or other surface. They are distinct from pens, which dispense liquid or gel ink onto the marked surface.

Most pencil cores are made of graphite powder mixed with a clay binder. Graphite pencils (traditionally known as "lead pencils") produce grey or black marks that are easily erased, but otherwise resistant to moisture, most solvents, ultraviolet radiation and natural aging. Other types of pencil cores, such as those of charcoal, are mainly used for drawing and sketching. Coloured pencils are sometimes used by teachers or editors to correct submitted texts, but are typically regarded as art supplies, especially those with cores made from wax-based binders that tend to smear when erasers are applied to them. Grease pencils have a softer, oily core that can leave marks on smooth surfaces such as glass or porcelain.

The most common pencil casing is thin wood, usually hexagonal in section, but sometimes cylindrical or triangular, permanently bonded to the core. Casings may be of other materials, such as plastic or paper. To use the pencil, the casing must be carved or peeled off to expose the working end of the core, which serves as a sharp point. Mechanical pencils have more elaborate casings which are not bonded to the core; instead, they support separate, mobile pigment cores that can be extended or retracted (usually through the casing's tip) as needed. These casings can be reloaded with new cores (usually graphite) as the previous ones are exhausted.

== History ==
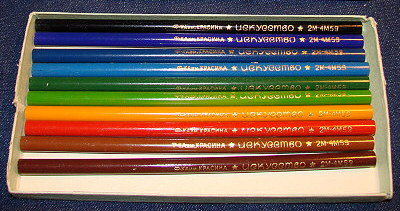
Old Soviet colored pencils with box (circa 1959)

=== Camel hair ===
Pencil, from Old French pincel, from late Latin penicillus a "little tail" (see penis; pincellus) originally referred to an artist's fine brush of camel hair, also used for writing before modern lead or chalk pencils.

Though the archetypal pencil was an artist's brush, the stylus, a thin metal stick used for scratching in papyrus or wax tablets, was used extensively by the Romans and for palm-leaf manuscripts.

=== Graphite deposit discoveries ===
As a technique for drawing, the closest predecessor to the pencil was silverpoint or leadpoint until, in 1565 (some sources say as early as 1500), a large deposit of graphite was discovered on the approach to Grey Knotts from the hamlet of Seathwaite in Borrowdale parish, Cumbria, England. This particular deposit of graphite was extremely pure and solid, and it could easily be sawn into sticks. It remains the only large-scale deposit of graphite ever found in this solid form. Chemistry was in its infancy, and the substance was thought to be a form of lead. Consequently, it was called plumbago (Latin for "lead ore"). Because the pencil core is still referred to as "lead", or "a lead", many people have the misconception that the graphite in the pencil is lead, and the black core of pencils is still referred to as lead, even though it never contained the element lead. The words for pencil in German (Bleistift), Irish (peann luaidhe), Arabic (قلم رصاص qalam raṣāṣ), and some other languages literally mean lead pen.

The value of graphite would soon be realised to be enormous, mainly because it could be used to line the moulds for cannonballs; the mines were taken over by the Crown and were guarded. When sufficient stores of graphite had been accumulated, the mines were flooded to prevent theft until more was required.

The usefulness of graphite for pencils was also discovered, but initially it had to be smuggled out of England. Because graphite is soft, it requires some form of encasement. Graphite sticks were initially wrapped in string or sheepskin for stability. England would enjoy a monopoly on the production of pencils until a method for reconstituting graphite powder was discovered in Germany in 1662. However, the distinctively square English pencils continued to be made with sticks cut from natural graphite into the 1860s. The town of Keswick, near the original findings of block graphite, still manufactures pencils, the factory also being the location of the Derwent Pencil Museum. The meaning of "graphite writing implement" apparently evolved late in the 16th century.

=== Wood encasement ===
Palomino Blackwing 602 pencils

Around 1560, an Italian couple, Simonio and Lyndiana Bernacotti, made what are likely the first blueprints for the modern, wood-encased carpentry pencil. Their version was a flat, oval, more compact type of pencil. Their concept involved the hollowing out of a stick of juniper wood. Shortly thereafter, a superior technique was discovered: two wooden halves were carved, a graphite stick inserted, and the halves then glued together—essentially the same method in use to this day.

=== Graphite powder and clay ===
The first attempt to manufacture graphite sticks from powdered graphite was in Nuremberg, Germany, in 1662. It used a mixture of graphite, sulphur, and antimony.

English and German pencils were not available to the French during the Napoleonic Wars; France, under a naval blockade imposed by Great Britain, was unable to import the pure graphite sticks from the British Grey Knotts mines – the only known source in the world. France was also unable to import the inferior German graphite pencil substitute. It took the efforts of an officer in Napoleon's army to change this. In 1795, Nicolas-Jacques Conté discovered a method of mixing powdered graphite with clay and forming the mixture into rods that were then fired in a kiln. By varying the ratio of graphite to clay, the hardness of the graphite rod could also be varied. This method of manufacture, which was discovered earlier by the Austrian Joseph Hardtmuth, the founder of Vienna's Koh-I-Noor company in 1790, remains in use. In 1802, the production of graphite leads from graphite and clay was patented by Koh-I-Noor.

In England, pencils continued to be made from whole sawn graphite. Henry Bessemer's first successful invention (1838) was a method of compressing graphite powder into solid graphite, thus allowing the waste from sawing to be reused.

=== United States ===
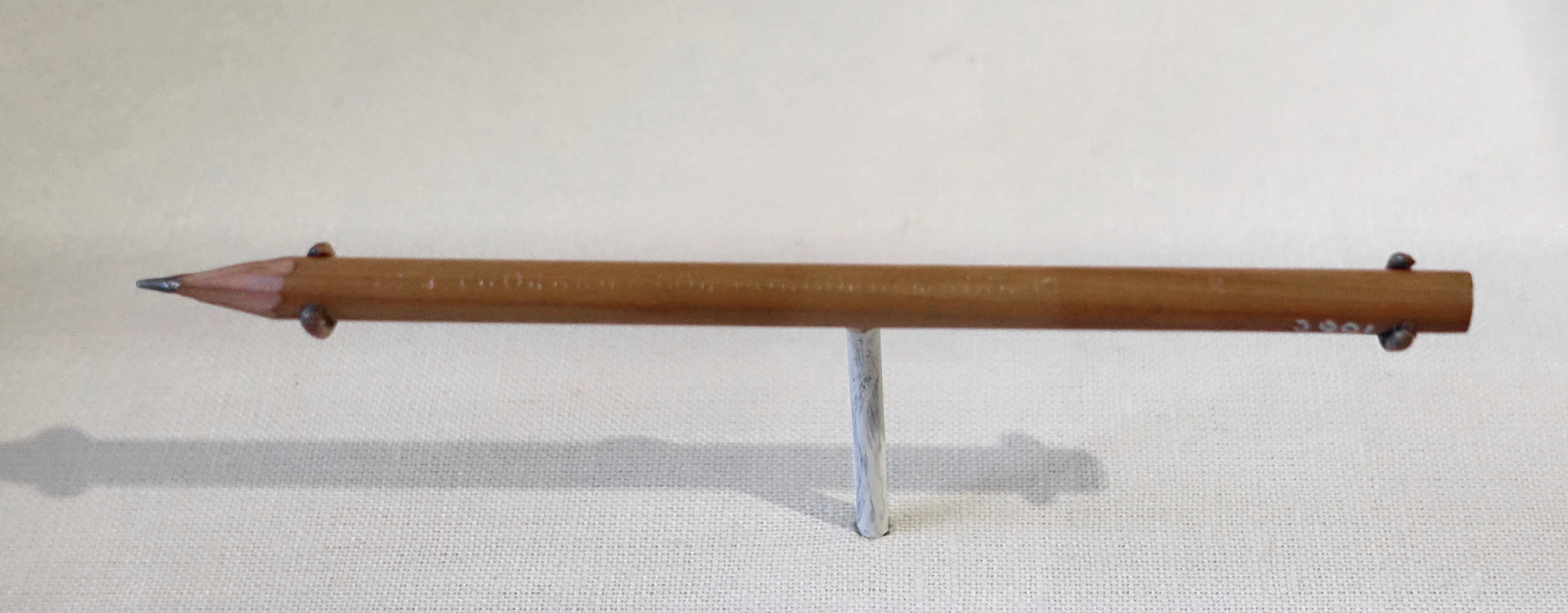
Pencil, perhaps made by Henry David Thoreau, in the Concord Museum

Pencil manufacturing. The top sequence shows the old method that required pieces of graphite to be cut to size; the lower sequence is the new, current method using rods of graphite and clay.

American colonists imported pencils from Europe until after the American Revolution. Benjamin Franklin advertised pencils for sale in The Pennsylvania Gazette in 1729, and George Washington used a three-inch (7.5 cm) pencil when he surveyed the Ohio Country in 1762. William Munroe, a cabinetmaker in Concord, Massachusetts, made the first American wood pencils in 1812. This was not the only pencil-making occurring in Concord. According to Henry Petroski, transcendentalist philosopher Henry David Thoreau discovered how to make a good pencil out of inferior graphite using clay as the binder; this invention was prompted by his father's pencil factory in Concord, which employed graphite found in New Hampshire in 1821 by Charles Dunbar.

Munroe's method of making pencils was painstakingly slow, and in the neighbouring town of Acton, a pencil mill owner named Ebenezer Wood set out to automate the process at his own pencil mill located at Nashoba Brook. He used the first circular saw in pencil production. He constructed the first of the hexagon- and octagon-shaped wooden casings. Ebenezer did not patent his invention and shared his techniques with anyone. One of those was Eberhard Faber, which built a factory in New York and became the leader in pencil production.

Joseph Dixon, an inventor and entrepreneur involved with the Tantiusques graphite mine in Sturbridge, Massachusetts, developed a means to mass-produce pencils. By 1870, the Joseph Dixon Crucible Company was the world's largest dealer and consumer of graphite and later became the contemporary Dixon Ticonderoga pencil and art supplies company.

By the end of the nineteenth century, over 240,000 pencils were used each day in the United States. The favoured timber for pencils was Red Cedar as it was aromatic and did not splinter when sharpened. In the early twentieth century, supplies of Red Cedar were dwindling so that pencil manufacturers were forced to recycle the wood from cedar fences and barns to maintain supply.

One effect of this was that "during World War II rotary pencil sharpeners were outlawed in Britain because they wasted so much scarce lead and wood, and pencils had to be sharpened in the more conservative manner – with knives."

It was soon discovered that incense cedar, when dyed and perfumed to resemble Red Cedar, was a suitable alternative. Most pencils today are made from this timber, which is grown in managed forests. Over 14 billion pencils are manufactured worldwide annually. Less popular alternatives to cedar include basswood and alder.

In Southeast Asia, the wood Jelutong may be used to create pencils (though the use of this rainforest species is controversial). Environmentalists prefer the use of Pulai – another wood native to the region in pencil manufacturing.

=== Eraser attachment ===
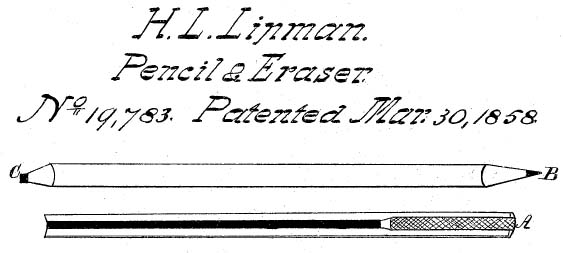
Attached eraser on the left; Pencil lead on the right

On 30 March 1858, Hymen Lipman received the first patent for attaching an eraser to the end of a pencil. In 1862, Lipman sold his patent to Joseph Reckendorfer for $100,000, who went on to sue pencil manufacturer Faber-Castell for infringement. In Reckendorfer v. Faber (1875), the Supreme Court of the United States ruled against Reckendorfer, declaring the patent invalid.

=== Extenders ===
Historian Henry Petroski notes that while ever more efficient means of mass-producing pencils had driven down replacement costs, people continued to use even the stub of a pencil for some time. For those who did not feel comfortable using a stub, pencil extenders were sold. These devices function something like a porte-crayon...the pencil stub can be inserted into the end of a shaft...Extenders were especially common among engineers and drafters, whose favourite pencils were priced dearly. The use of an extender also has the advantage that the pencil does not appreciably change its heft as it wears down. Artists use extenders to maximize the use of their colored pencils.

== Types ==
=== By marking material ===
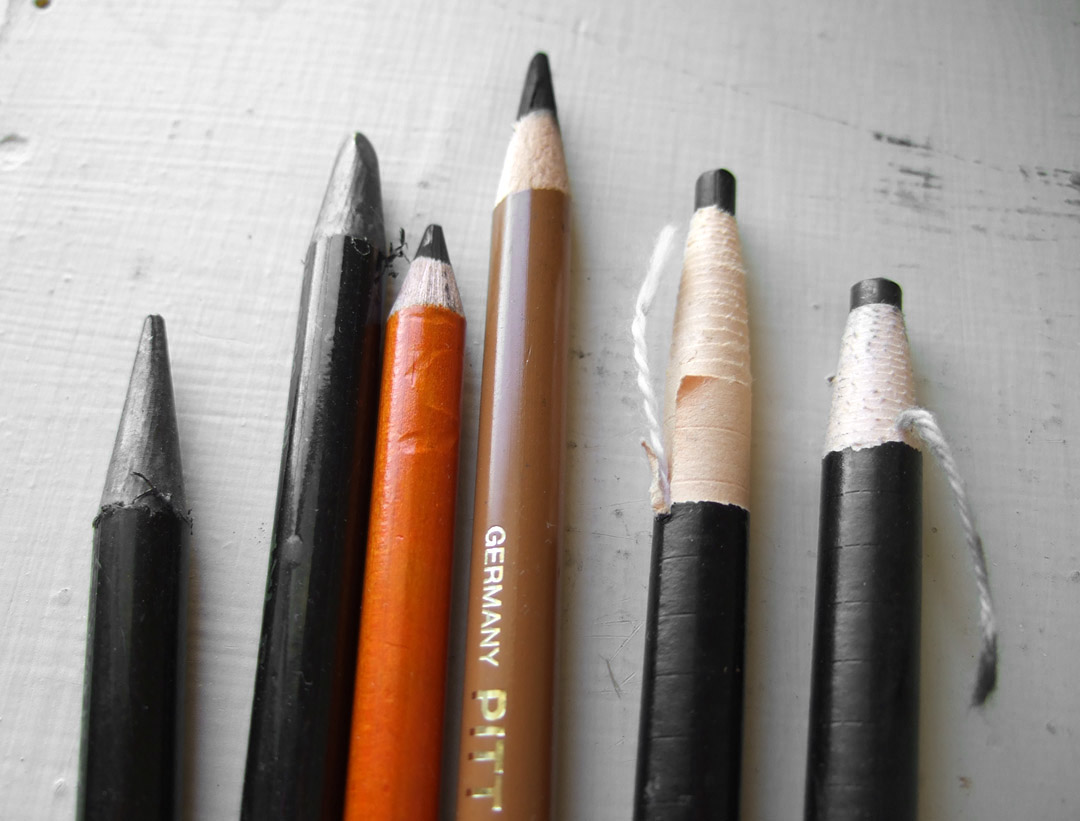
Two solid, or "woodless", graphite pencils, two charcoal pencils, and two grease pencils

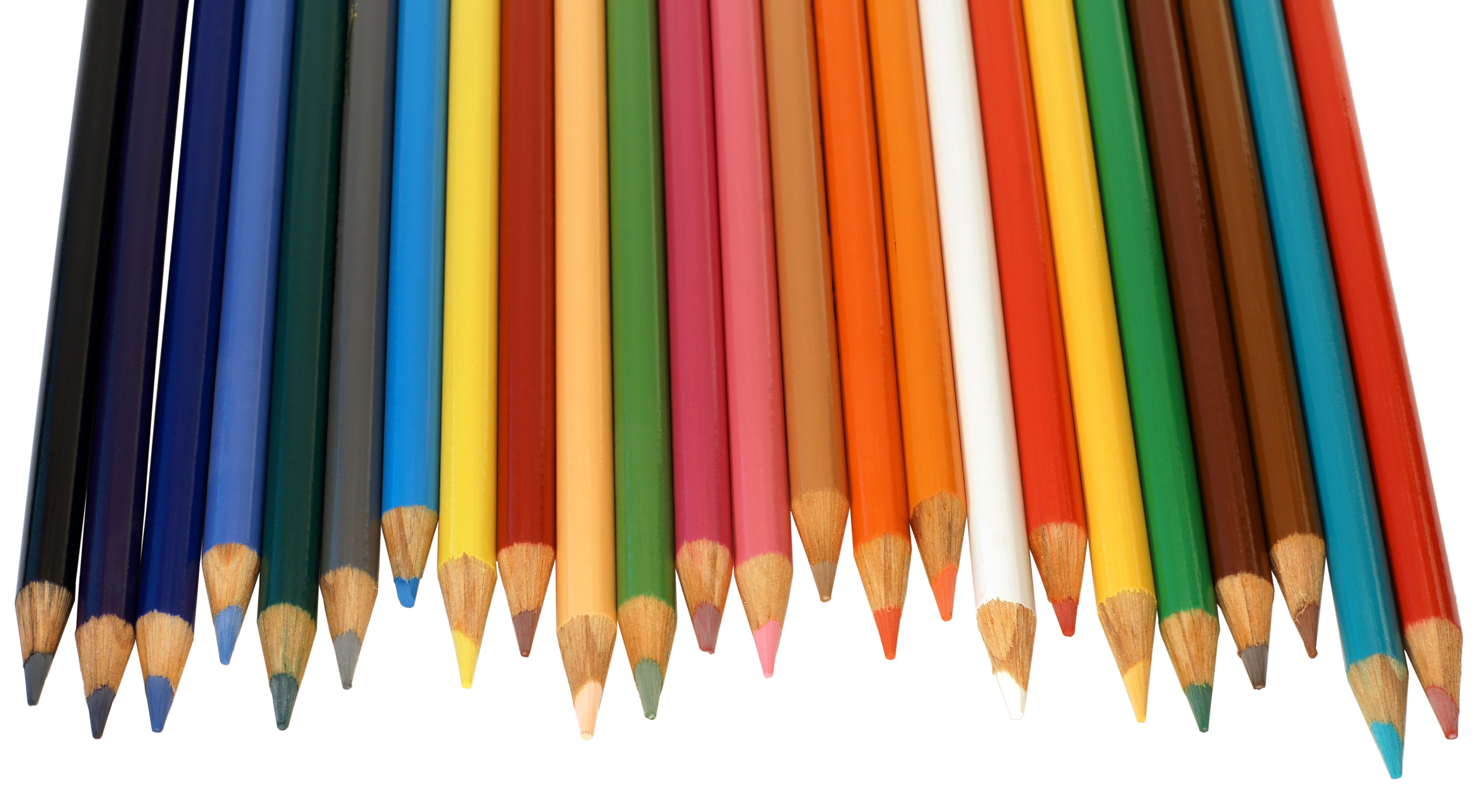
Coloured pencils

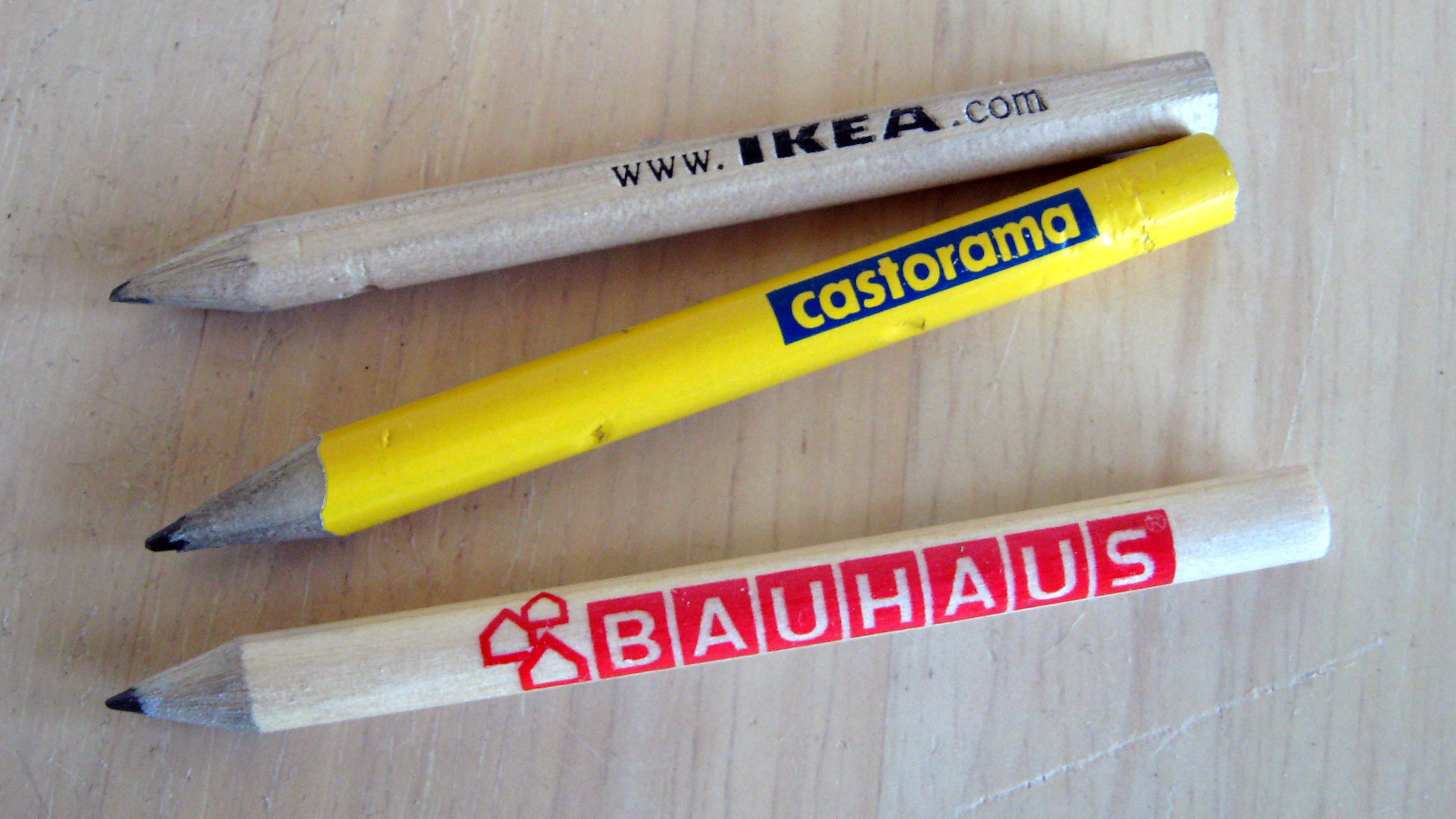
Promotional pencils

==== Graphite ====
Graphite pencils are the most common type of pencil, and are encased in wood. They are made of a mixture of clay and graphite, and their darkness varies from light grey to black. Their composition allows for the smoothest strokes. Pentel has marketed synthetic resin bonded graphite for mechanical pencils since the introduction of its Hi Polymer lead in 1960, and it also sold wood cased graphite pencils such as the Japanese Black Polymer 999 (CB100), described by a retailer as using a carbon graphite "resin core".

==== Solid ====
Solid graphite pencils are solid sticks of graphite and clay composite (as found in a 'graphite pencil'), about the diameter of a common pencil, which have no casing other than a wrapper or label. They are often called "woodless" pencils. They are used primarily for artistic purposes, as the lack of casing allows them to cover larger spaces more easily, create different effects, and provide greater economy, as the entire pencil is used. They are available in the same darkness range as wood-encased graphite pencils.

==== Liquid ====
Liquid graphite pencils are pencils that write like pens. The technology was first invented in 1955 by Scripto and Parker Pens. Scripto's liquid graphite formula came out about three months before Parker's liquid lead formula. To avoid a lengthy patent fight, the two companies agreed to share their formulas.

==== Charcoal ====
Charcoal pencils are made of charcoal and provide fuller blacks than graphite pencils, but tend to smudge easily and are more abrasive than graphite. Sepia-toned and white pencils are also available for duotone techniques.

==== Carbon pencils ====
Carbon pencils are generally made of a mixture of clay and lamp black, but are sometimes blended with charcoal or graphite depending on the darkness and manufacturer. They produce a fuller black than graphite pencils, are smoother than charcoal, and have minimal dust and smudging. They also blend very well, much like charcoal.

==== Colored ====
Colored pencils, or pencil crayons, have wax-like cores with pigment and other fillers. Several colors are sometimes blended.

==== Grease ====
Grease pencils can write on virtually any surface (including glass, plastic, metal, and photographs). The most commonly found grease pencils are encased in paper (Berol and Sanford Peel-off), but they can also be encased in wood (Staedtler Omnichrom).

==== Watercolor ====
Watercolor pencils are designed for use with watercolor techniques. Their cores can be diluted by water. The pencils can be used on their own for sharp, bold lines. Strokes made by the pencil can also be saturated with water and spread with brushes.

=== By use ===
==== Carpentry ====
Carpenter's pencils are pencils that have two main properties: their shape prevents them from rolling, and their graphite is strong. The oldest surviving pencil is a German carpenter's pencil dating from the 17th century and now in the Faber-Castell collection.

==== Copying ====
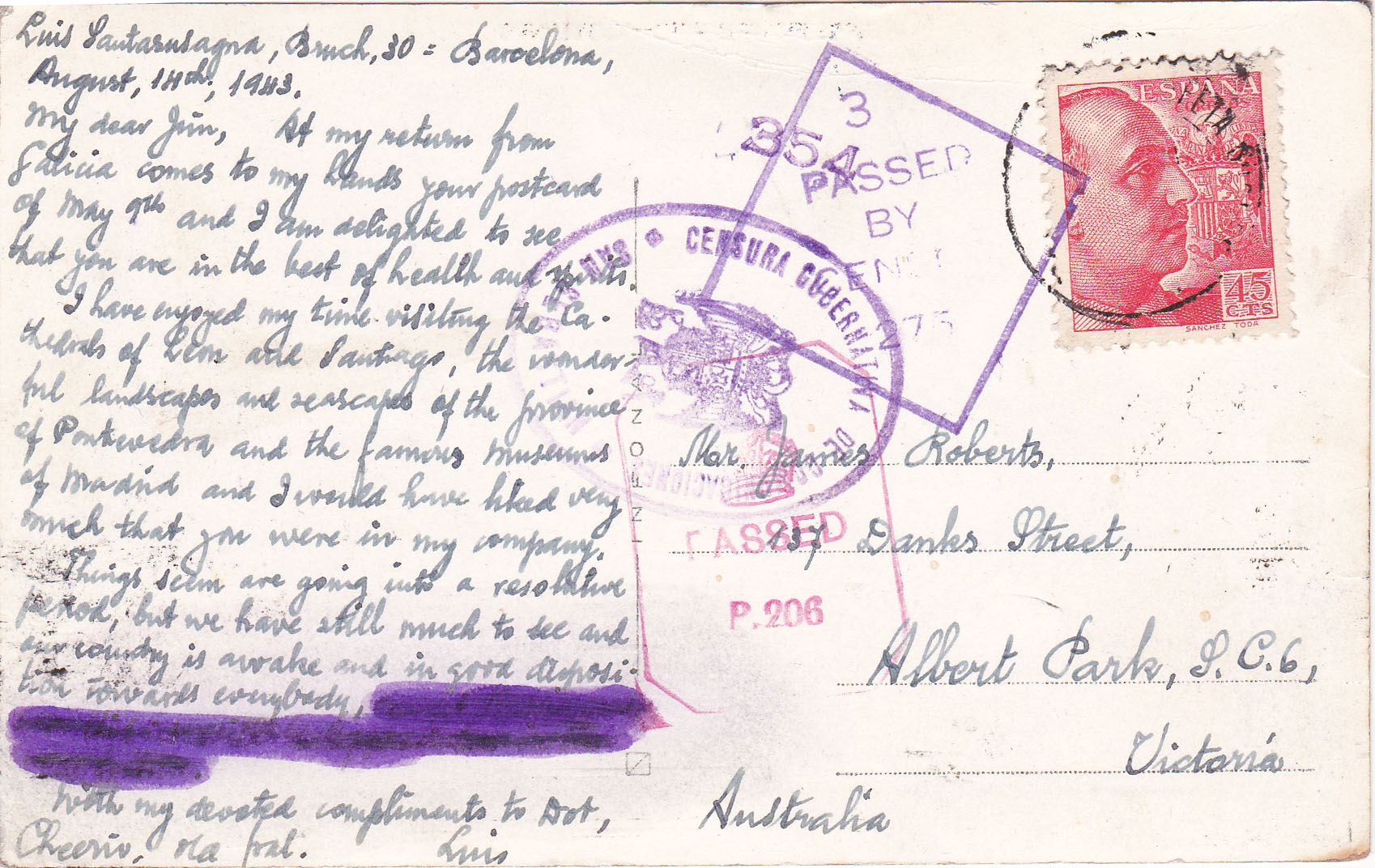
Obliteration by indelible pencil to censor mail in 1943

Copying pencils (or indelible pencils) are graphite pencils with an added dye that creates an indelible mark. They were invented in the late 19th century for press copying and as a practical substitute for fountain pens. Their markings are often visually indistinguishable from those of standard graphite pencils, but when moistened, they dissolve into a coloured ink, which is then pressed into another piece of paper. They were widely used until the mid-20th century, when ball pens slowly replaced them. In Italy, their use is still mandated by law for voting paper ballots in elections and referendums.

==== Eyeliner ====
Eyeliner pencils are used for makeup. Unlike traditional copying pencils, eyeliner pencils usually contain non-toxic dyes.

==== Erasable coloring ====
Unlike wax-based colored pencils, the erasable variants can be easily erased. Their main use is in sketching, where the objective is to create an outline using the same colour that other media (such as wax pencils or watercolor paints) would fill or when the objective is to scan the colour sketch. Some animators prefer erasable colour pencils as opposed to graphite pencils because they do not smudge as easily, and the different colors allow for better separation of objects in the sketch. Copy-editors find them useful too, as markings stand out more than those of graphite, but can be erased.

==== Non-reproduction ====
Also known as non-photo blue pencils, the non-reproducing types make marks that are not reproducible by photocopiers (examples include "Copy-not" by Sanford and "Mars Non-photo" by Staedtler) or by whiteprint copiers (such as "Mars Non-Print" by Staedtler).

==== Stenography ====
Stenographer's pencils, also known as a steno pencil, are expected to be very reliable, and their lead is break-proof. Nevertheless, steno pencils are sometimes sharpened at both ends to enhance reliability. They are round to avoid pressure pain during long texts.

==== Short customer-use ====
Various stores and other public-facing services provide pencils for use in writing down transaction details or notes while on the premises. They are sometimes unusually short and typically produced at low cost.

Golf pencils are used to record hole-by-hole details during a round of golf. A common length is 9 cm or 3.5 in). They are also known as library pencils, as many libraries offer them as disposable writing instruments with scratch paper to make notes, such as looking up materials in the card catalog to note their location. IKEA pencils are provided in IKEA stores, but have sometimes been repurposed for uses far beyond traditional writing on paper.

=== By shape ===
- Triangular (more accurately a Reuleaux triangle)
- Hexagonal (hex and semi-hex)
- Round
- Bendable (flexible plastic)

=== By size ===
==== Typical ====
A standard, hexagonal, "#2 pencil" is cut to a hexagonal height of 6 mm (1/4 in), but the outer diameter is slightly larger (about 7 mm or 9/32 in) A standard, "#2", hexagonal pencil is 19 cm (7.5 in) long.

==== Biggest ====
On 3 September 2007, Ashrita Furman unveiled his giant US$20,000 pencil – 23 metres (76 ft) long, 8,200 kilograms (18,000 lb) with over 2,000 kilograms (4,500 lb) for the graphite centre – after three weeks of creation in August 2007 as a birthday gift for teacher Sri Chinmoy. It is longer than the 20-metre (65 ft) pencil outside the Malaysia HQ of stationers Faber-Castell.

=== By manufacture ===
==== Mechanical ====
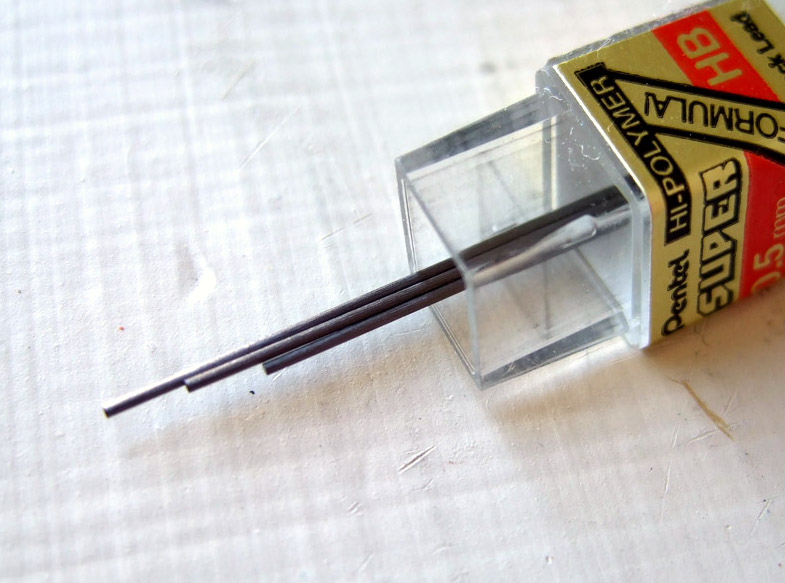
Lead for mechanical pencils

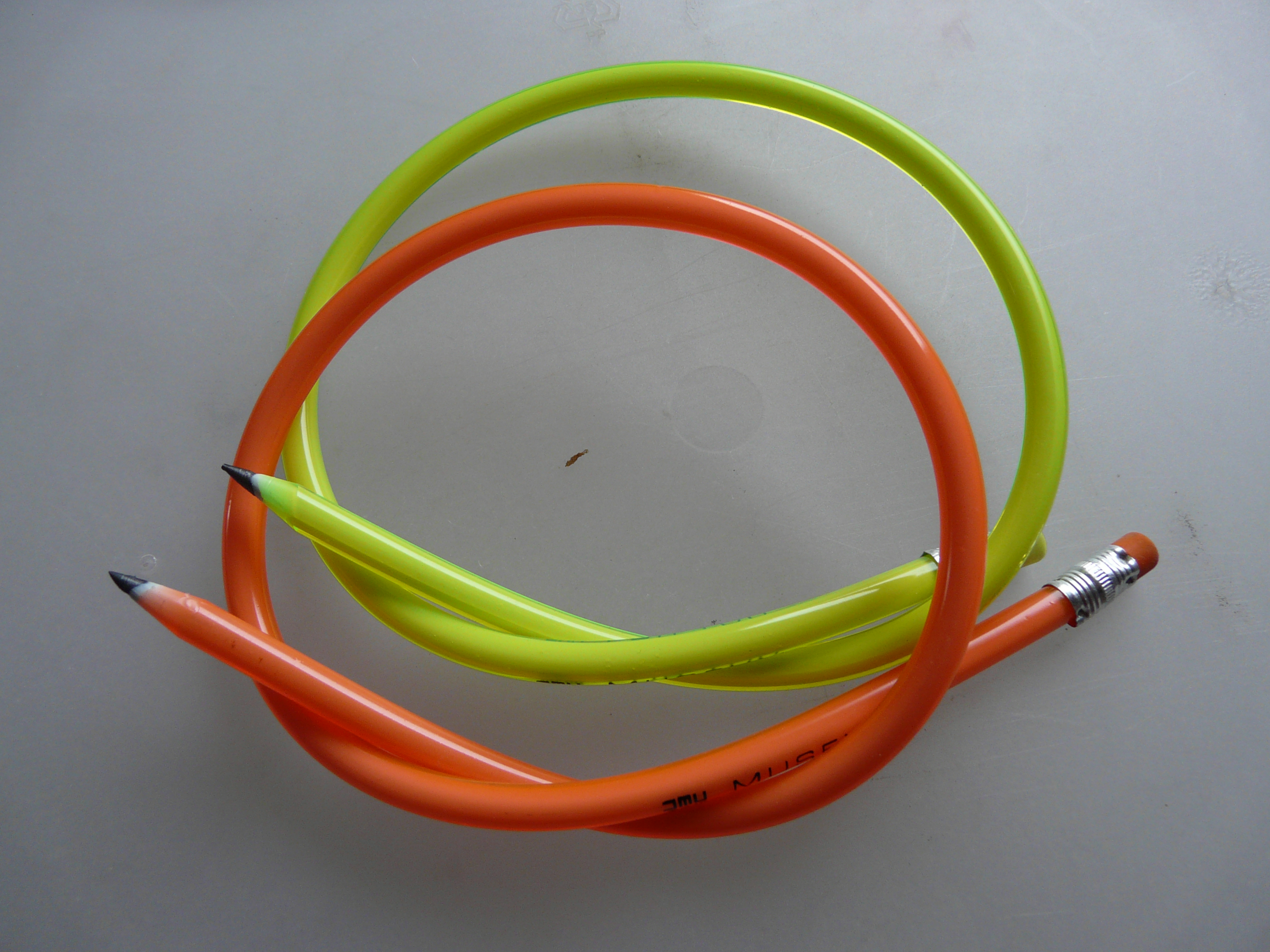
Flexible pencils

Mechanical pencils use mechanical methods to push lead through a hole at the end. These can be divided into two groups: with propelling pencils, an internal mechanism is employed to push the lead out from an internal compartment, while clutch pencils merely hold the lead in place (the lead is extended by releasing it and allowing some external force, usually gravity, to pull it out of the body). The erasers (sometimes replaced by a sharpener on pencils with larger lead sizes) are also removable (and thus replaceable), and usually have a place to store replacement leads. Mechanical pencils are popular for their longevity and the fact that they may never need sharpening. Lead types are based on grade and size; with standard sizes being 2.00 mm (0.079 in), 1.40 mm (0.055 in), 1.00 mm (0.039 in), 0.70 mm (0.028 in), 0.50 mm (0.020 in), 0.35 mm (0.014 in), 0.25 mm (0.0098 in), 0.18 mm (0.0071 in), and 0.13 mm (0.0051 in) (ISO 9175-1)—the 0.90 mm (0.035 in) size is available, but is not considered a standard ISO size.

==== Pop a Point ====
Pioneered by Taiwanese stationery manufacturer Bensia Pioneer Industrial Corporation in the early 1970s, Pop a Point Pencils are also known as Bensia Pencils, stackable pencils or non-sharpening pencils. It is a type of pencil where many short pencil tips are housed in a cartridge-style plastic holder. A blunt tip is removed by pulling it from the writing end of the body and re-inserting it into the open-ended bottom of the body, thereby pushing a new tip to the top.

==== Plastic ====
Invented by Harold Grossman for the Empire Pencil Company in 1967, plastic pencils were subsequently improved upon by Arthur D. Little for Empire from 1969 through the early 1970s; Empire commercialised the plastic pencil as the "EPCON" Pencil. These pencils were co-extruded, extruding a plasticised graphite mix within a wood-composite core.

=== Other aspects ===
- By factory state: sharpened, unsharpened
- By casing material: wood, paper, plastic
- The P&P Office Waste Paper Processor recycles paper into pencils

== Health ==
Residual graphite from a pencil stick is not poisonous, and graphite is harmless if consumed.

Although lead has not been used for writing since antiquity, such as in Roman styli, lead poisoning from pencils was not uncommon. Until the middle of the 20th century, the paint used for the outer coating could contain high concentrations of lead, and this could be ingested when the pencil was sucked or chewed.

== Manufacture ==
The lead of the pencil is a mix of finely ground graphite and clay powders. Before the two substances are mixed, they are separately cleaned of foreign matter and dried to form large square cakes. Once the cakes have fully dried, the graphite and the clay squares are mixed using water. The amount of clay content added to the graphite depends on the intended pencil hardness (lower proportions of clay makes the core softer), and the amount of time spent on grinding the mixture determines the quality of the lead. The mixture is then shaped into long spaghetti-like strings, straightened, dried, cut, and then tempered in a kiln. The resulting strings are dipped in oil or molten wax, which seeps into the material's tiny pores and enables the pencil's smooth writing. A juniper or incense-cedar plank with several long parallel grooves is cut to fashion a "slat," and the graphite/clay strings are inserted into the grooves. Another grooved plank is glued on top, and the whole assembly is then cut into individual pencils, which are then varnished or painted. Many pencils feature an eraser on the top, and so the process is usually still considered incomplete at this point. Each pencil has a shoulder cut on one end to allow a metal ferrule to be secured to the wood. A rubber plug is then inserted into the ferrule to provide a functional eraser at the end of the pencil.

== Grading and classification ==
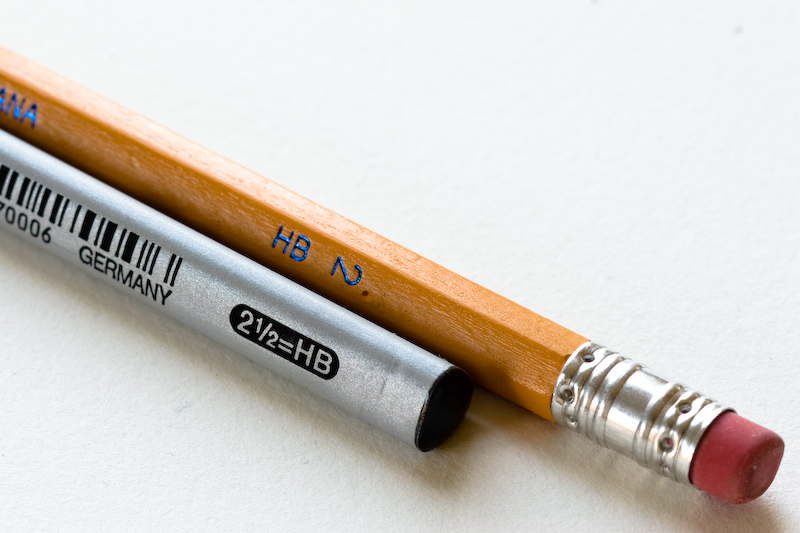
Two HB graphite pencils, one graded as "2" and the other as "2 1/2".

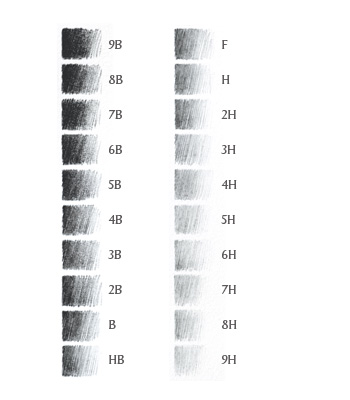
A grading chart ranging from 9B to 9H

Graphite pencils are made of a mixture of clay and graphite, and their darkness varies from black to light grey. Adding more clay to the pencil makes it harder, leaving lighter marks. There is a wide range of grades available, mainly for artists who are interested in creating a full range of tones from light grey to black. Engineers prefer harder pencils, which allow for greater control in the shape of the lead.

Manufacturers distinguish their pencils by grading them, but there is no common standard. Two pencils of the same grade, but different manufacturers, will not necessarily make a mark of identical tone nor have the same hardness. (Note: Pencil grades vary "depending upon the manufacturer, when the pencils are made, and the source of graphite and clay. One analyst found that graphitic carbon content, for example, varies from about 30 to about 65 in a variety of different pencils bearing the same designation." Petroski 1990, p. 229)

Most manufacturers, and almost all in Europe, designate their pencils with the letters H (commonly interpreted as "hardness") to B (commonly "blackness"), as well as F (usually taken to mean "fineness", although F pencils are no finer or more easily sharpened than any other grade. Also referred to as "firm" by many manufacturers). The standard writing pencil is graded HB. (Note: This is not related to the Brinell scale hardness unit HB.) This designation, in the form "H. B.", was in use at least as early as 1814. Softer or harder pencil grades were described by a sequence or successive Bs or Hs such as BB and BBB for successively softer leads, and HH and HHH for successively harder ones. The Koh-i-Noor Hardtmuth pencil manufacturers claim to have first used the HB designations, with H standing for Hardtmuth, B for the company's location of Budějovice, and F for Franz Hardtmuth, who was responsible for technological improvements in pencil manufacture.

As of 2021, a set of pencils ranging from a very soft, black-marking pencil to a very hard, light-marking pencil usually ranges from softest to hardest as follows:

Graphite pencil hardness grading and typical applications
Tone and grade designations			Character	Application examples
Europe	US	RUS	Character	Application examples
9B	–	–	extremely soft, black	for artistic purposes: sketches; studies; drafts
8B	–	–	extremely soft, black	for artistic purposes: sketches; studies; drafts
7B	–	–	extremely soft, black	for artistic purposes: sketches; studies; drafts
6B	–	–	extremely soft, black	for artistic purposes: sketches; studies; drafts
5B	–	–	extremely soft, black	for artistic purposes: sketches; studies; drafts
4B	–	–	extremely soft, black	for artistic purposes: sketches; studies; drafts
3B	–	3M	soft	freehand drawing; writing (restricted)
2B	#0	2М	soft	freehand drawing; writing (restricted)
B	#1	M	soft	freehand drawing; writing (restricted)
HB	#2	TM	medium	writing; linear drawing
F	#2½^{*}	–	medium	writing; linear drawing
H	#3	T	hard	technical drawing; mathematical drawing
2H	#4	2T	hard	technical drawing; mathematical drawing
3H	–	3T	very hard	technical detailed plans; graphical representations
4H	–	–	very hard	technical detailed plans; graphical representations
5H	–	–	very hard	technical detailed plans; graphical representations
6H	–	–	extremely hard, light grey	for special purposes: lithography; cartography; xylography
7H	–	–	extremely hard, light grey	for special purposes: lithography; cartography; xylography
8H	–	–	extremely hard, light grey	for special purposes: lithography; cartography; xylography
9H	–	–	extremely hard, light grey	for special purposes: lithography; cartography; xylography
^{*}Also seen as 2 2/4, 2 4/8, 2.5, 2 5/10

Koh-i-noor offers twenty grades from 10H to 8B for its 1500 series. Mitsubishi Pencil offers twenty-two grades from 10H to 10B for its Hi-uni range. Derwent produces twenty grades from 9H to 9B for its graphic pencils. Staedtler produces 24 from 10H to 12B for its Mars Lumograph pencils.

Numbers as designations were first used by Conté and later by John Thoreau in the 19th century. (Note: Conté used integer numbers that started at 1, with higher numbers indicating softer leads, while Thoreau used higher numbers to designate harder leads (Petroski 1990, p. 157). It is believed that Thoreau developed his method of mixing clay and graphite independently, and his use of numbers to designate grades is evidence that he was at least aware of Conté's methods and tried to reverse-engineer them. Thoreau offered pencils graduated from 1 to 4 in the mid-1800s (Petroski 1990, p. 119), see also John H. Lienhard (1989). "Thoreau's Pencils". The Engines of Our Ingenuity. Episode 339. NPR. KUHF-FM Houston. Transcript. uh.edu) Although Conté/Thoreau's equivalence table is widely accepted, not all manufacturers follow it; for example, Faber-Castell uses a different equivalence table in its Grip 2001 pencils: 1 = 2B, 2 = B, 2½ = HB, 3 = H, 4 = 2H.

=== Hardness test ===
Graded pencils can be used for a rapid test that provides relative ratings for a series of coated panels, but cannot be used to compare the pencil hardness of different coatings. This test defines the "pencil hardness" of a coating as the grade of the hardest pencil that does not permanently mark the coating when pressed firmly against it at a 45-degree angle. (Note: This testing method is approved by the ISO as standard ISO 15184:1998 Paints and varnishes – Determination of film hardness by pencil test ISO.org Archived 26 October 2017 at the Wayback Machine. See pra-world.com Archived 29 September 2007 at the Wayback Machine for a description of the test. However, pencil hardness is not standardised. For this reason, the standard specifies specific pencil brands to be used in this test.) For standardized measurements, there are Mohs hardness testing pencils on the market.

== External colour and shape ==
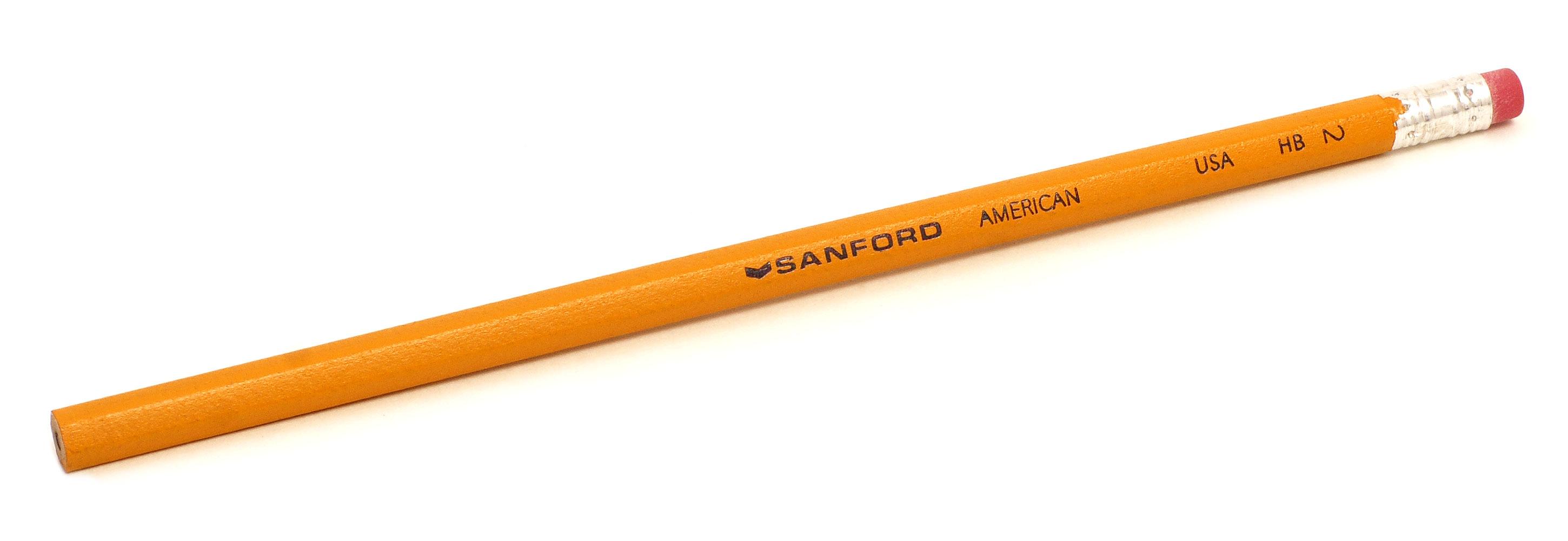
A typical yellow no. 2 pencil

The majority of pencils made in the US are painted yellow. (Note: 75% of the 2.8 billion pencils made in the US are painted yellow (Steve Ritter "Pencils & Pencil Lead", Chemical & Engineering News, Volume 79, Number 42, page 35, 15 October 2001). Pubs.acs.org) According to Henry Petroski, this tradition began in 1890 when the L. & C. Hardtmuth Company of Austria-Hungary introduced their Koh-I-Noor brand, named after the famous diamond. It was intended to be the world's best and most expensive pencil, as the end of the pencil was dipped in 14-carat gold; and at a time when most pencils were either painted in dark colours or not painted at all, the Koh-I-Noor was yellow. As well as simply being distinctive, the colour may have been inspired by the Austro-Hungarian flag; it was also suggestive of the Orient at a time when the best-quality graphite came from Siberia. Other companies then copied the yellow colour so that their pencils would be associated with this high-quality brand, and chose brand names with explicit Oriental references, such as Mikado (renamed Mirado) (Note: Eagle Pencil Company applied for the trademark Mirado in 1947 (US Trademark 71515261). It is a common belief that this was an attempt to disassociate the pencil brand from Japan, as one of the meanings of Mikado is emperor of Japan.) (Note: Mikado/Mirado pencils were originally made by Eagle Pencil Company – today Berol – but can also be found today under the trademark Papermate and Sanford as Sanford owns Berol and the trademark Papermate Brandnamepencils.com Archived 29 September 2007 at the Wayback Machine Mirado Pencil) and Mongol. (Note: Originally made by Eberhard Faber the Mongol trademark is now owned by Sanford Timberlines.blogspot.com Archived 4 March 2016 at the Wayback Machine Timberlines Blog "Mongolized" 31 August 2005. Retrieved 23 August 2007.)

Not all countries use yellow pencils. German and Brazilian pencils, for example, are often green, blue, or black, based on the trademark colours of Faber-Castell, a major German stationery company which has plants in those countries. In southern European countries, pencils tend to be dark red or black with yellow lines, while in Australia, they are red with black bands at one end. In India, the most common pencil colour scheme was dark red with black lines, and pencils with a large number of colour schemes are produced.

Pencils are commonly round, hexagonal, or sometimes triangular in section. Carpenters' pencils are typically oval or rectangular, so they cannot easily roll away during work.

== Manufacturers ==
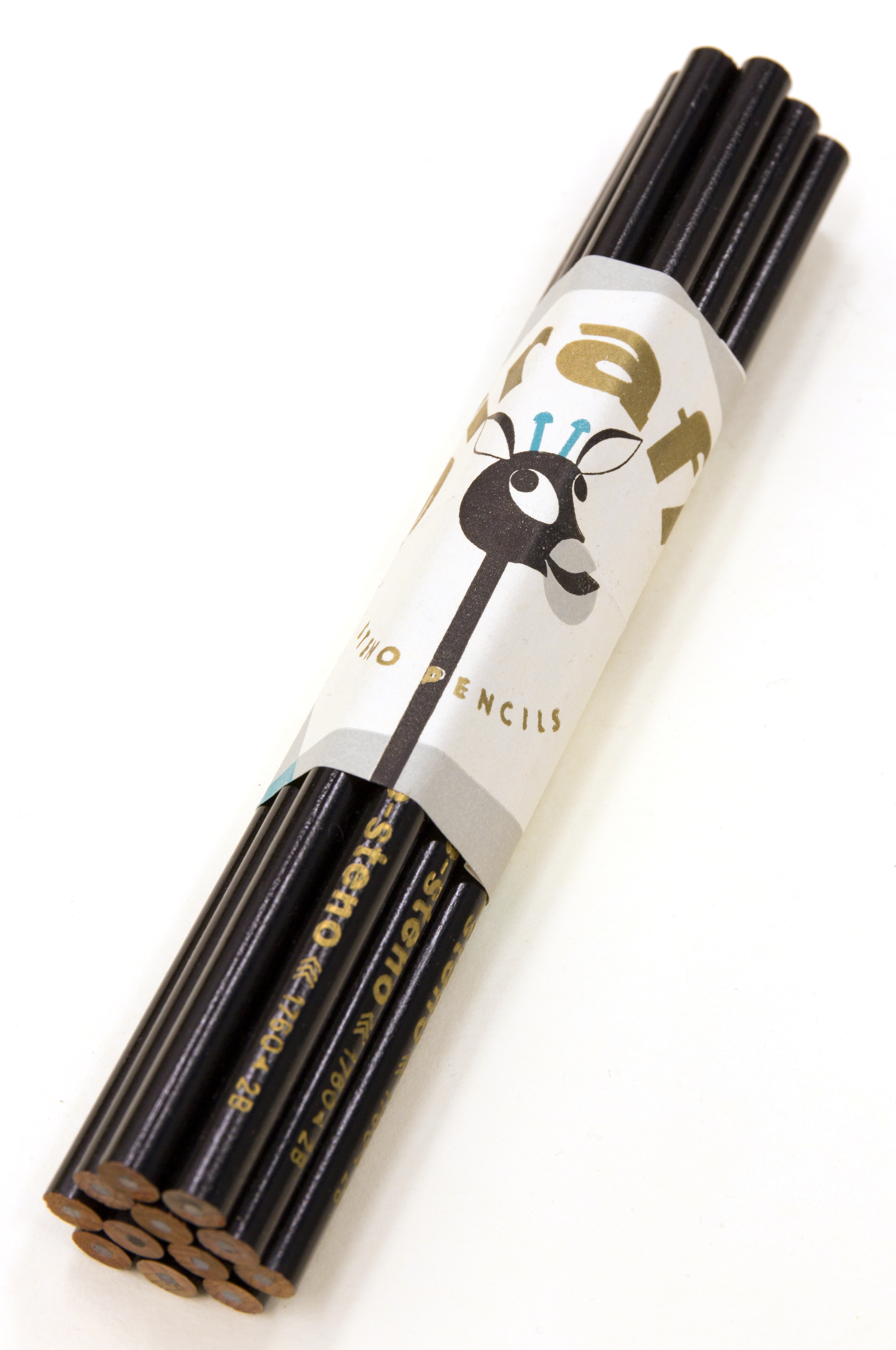
A collection of pencils (12) by Bohemia Works Czech Republic from the Ministry of Construction of the GDR in the stock of the MEK

Prominent global manufacturers of wood-cased (including wood-free) pencils:

Manufacturer	Country of origin	Countries of Production	Pencil Brands
Caran d'Ache	Switzerland	Switzerland	Caran d'Ache
China First Pencil Co.	China	China	Chung Hwa, Tientan, Great Wall
Brevillier Urban & Sachs Bleistiftfabrik	Austria	Austria	Cretacolor, Brevillier & Urban
Derwent Cumberland Pencil Company	UK	UK	Derwent
Dixon Ticonderoga	USA	USA, Mexico, China, Canada	Dixon, Oriole, Ticonderoga
Faber-Castell AG	Germany	Germany, Indonesia, Costa Rica, Brazil, Malaysia	Faber-Castell
FILA Group	Italy	?	Temagraph, Lyra, Dixon, Ticonderoga, DOMS
General Pencil Co.	USA	USA	General's, Kimberly, Semi-Hex, Badger, Wasp, ...
Hindustan Pencils	India	India	Apsara, Nataraj
Koh-i-Noor Hardtmuth	Czech Republic	Czech Republic, Bulgaria	Koh-i-Noor
Lyra Bleistift-Fabrik	belongs since 2008 to FILA Group		
Mitsubishi Pencil Company	Japan	Japan	Uni, Hi-uni, Mitsu-Bishi 9800 series, Mitsubishi, Boxy
Musgrave Pencil Company	USA	USA	Tennessee Red, Harvest 320, Ceres 909, Test scoring 101
Newell Brands	USA	? production sites in the USA, Canada, Mexico, France, the United Kingdom, and Germany, but can't find where the pencils are produced	Paper Mate, Berol, Rotring, Prismacolor
Palomino, Division of California Cedar Products	USA	USA, Thailand	Blackwing, Palomino, Prospector
Staedtler Mars GmbH & Co.	Germany	Germany	Staedtler
Tombow Pencil Co.	Japan	Japan	MONO
Viarco	Portugal	Portugal	Clássico 250, Carpenter 1016, Carpenter 1019, Industrial, Comercial

== See also ==
- Blackwing 602
- Pencil drawing
- Plumbago drawing
- Tortillon
- I, Pencil

== Bibliography ==
- Petroski, Henry (1990). The Pencil: A History of Design and Circumstance. New York: Alfred A. Knopf. ISBN 0-394-57422-2.
