= IKEA pencil =

Pencil found at IKEA

IKEA pencils
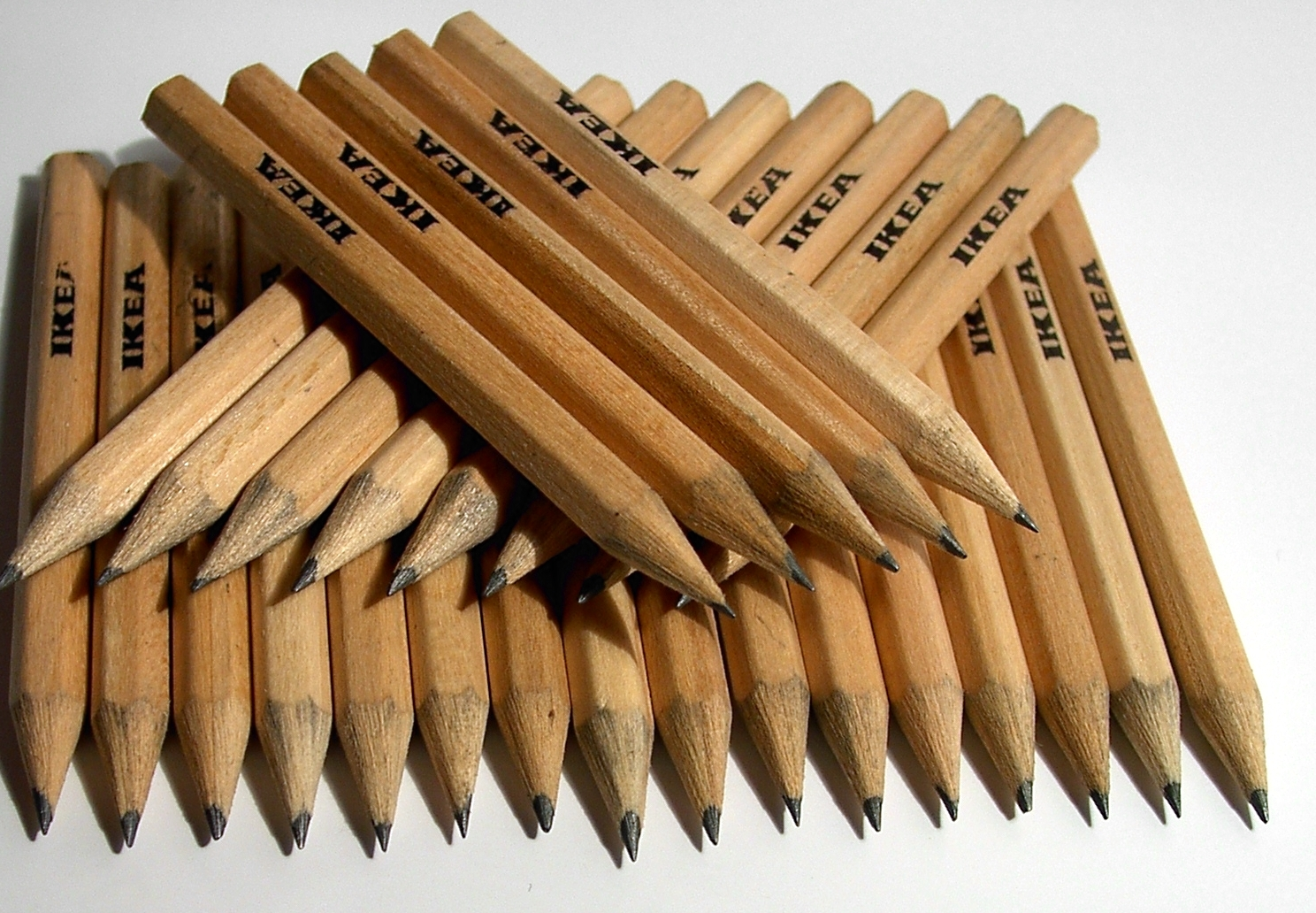
- Set of modern IKEA pencils
- Product type: Pencil
- Current owner: IKEA
- Markets: Worldwide

IKEA pencils are small pencils provided for free in IKEA stores worldwide. They are found in small boxes attached to poles, together with maps, measuring tapes and shopping forms. The IKEA pencil has been known for the wide variety of designs. Through the years the color changed from blue, to yellow to the natural color of wood. Despite the different colors, its dimensions have always been 7×87mm. Their common in-store application is for notetaking, with customers making note of selected items from product tags onto their notepads and visiting the self-service furniture warehouse to collect their showroom products in flat pack form, using their notes to locate their products.

== Overview ==
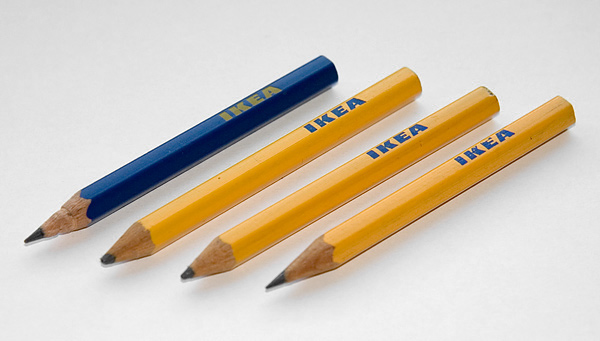
Old IKEA pencils

IKEA orders 5.2 million pencils yearly for its Canadian stores alone, and the company does not disapprove of customers that put them to other uses such as craft projects or works of art. The Dutch artist Judith Delleman constructed a chair out of hundreds of them. When an IKEA store first opened in South Korea, two years' worth of free pencils were consumed in the span of two months.

Being disposable, the pencils are also used by surgeons to mark osteotomy cuts in craniofacial and maxillofacial surgery. Another application of pencils is to draw electronic circuits, and IKEA pencils have been used in the fabrication of free chlorine sensors for drinking water.

In 2015, IKEA released an advertisement on their various social media profiles about their free pencils, with the label "Absolutely familiar. Entirely free", in an attempt to mock the new Apple Pencil.

In 2023, IKEA Singapore marked its 45th anniversary by releasing a 45-centimeter version of its iconic pencil, featuring a stretched "o" in the word "long" on the side. Asheen Naidu, Executive Creative Director at TBWA\Singapore, noted that the project was intended as a fun, nostalgic tribute to the customers who have supported the brand over the decades.

== See also ==
- Golf pencil
