= České Libchavy =

- Municipality
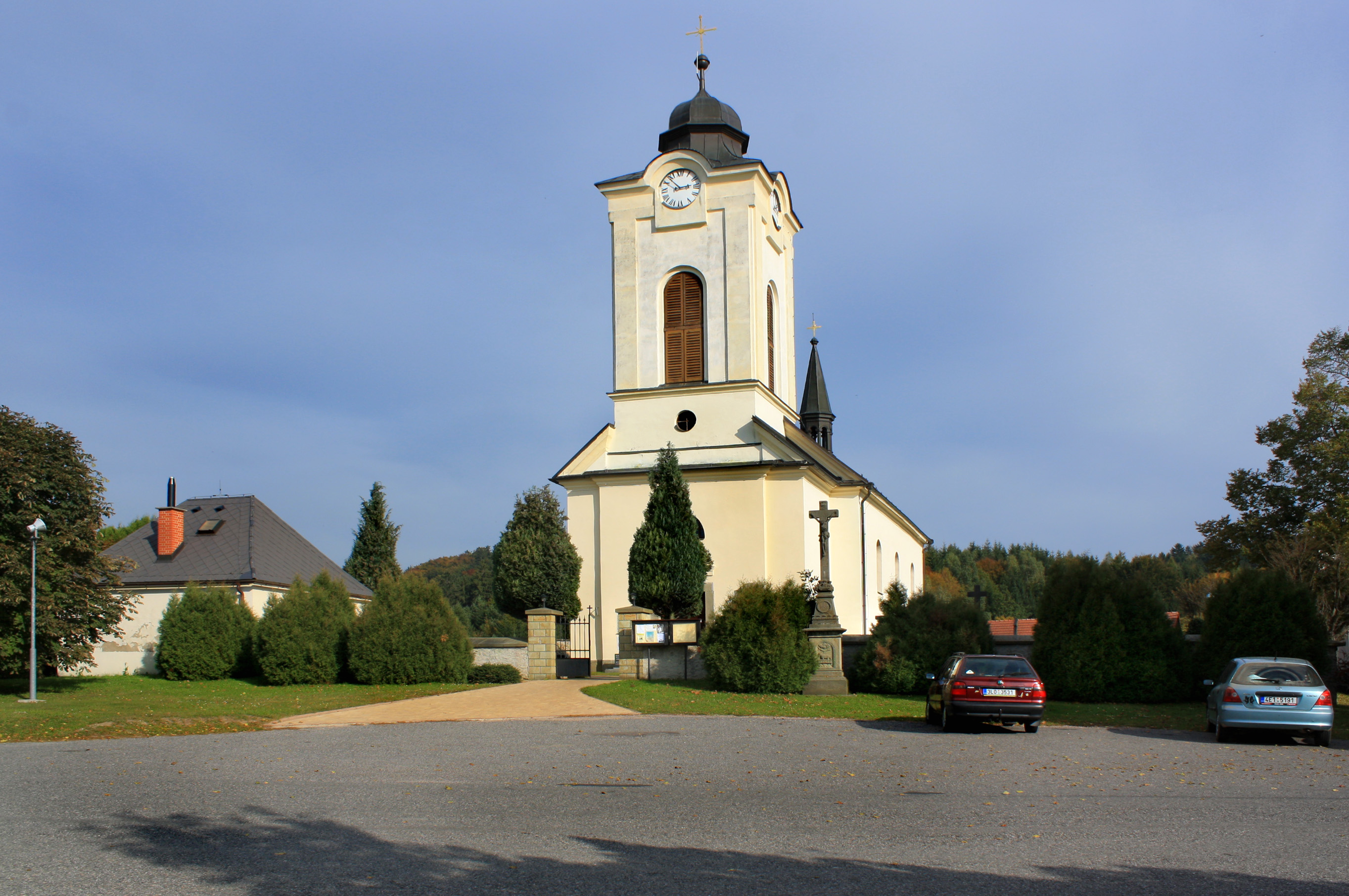
- Church of Saint Vitus

- Flag Coat of arms

- Location in the Czech Republic
- Coordinates: 50°1′47″N 16°22′18″E
- Country: Czech Republic
- Region: Pardubice
- District: Ústí nad Orlicí
- First mentioned: 1360

Area
  - Total: 8.72 km^{2} (3.37 sq mi)
- Elevation: 355 m (1,165 ft)

Population (2026-01-01)
  - Total: 660
  - Density: 76/km^{2} (200/sq mi)
- Time zone: UTC+1 (CET)
  - Summer (DST): UTC+2 (CEST)
- Postal code: 561 14
- Website: www.ceskelibchavy.cz

České Libchavy (German: Böhmisch Lichwe) is a municipality and village in Ústí nad Orlicí District in the Pardubice Region of the Czech Republic. It has about 700 inhabitants.

== Demographics ==
Historical population
Year	Pop.	±%
1869	842	—
1880	886	+5.2%
1890	1,001	+13.0%
1900	1,002	+0.1%
1910	881	−12.1%
1921	728	−17.4%
1930	654	−10.2%
1950	507	−22.5%
1961	546	+7.7%
1970	514	−5.9%
1980	518	+0.8%
1991	475	−8.3%
2001	458	−3.6%
2011	584	+27.5%
2021	606	+3.8%
Source: Censuses
