= Koh-i-Noor Hardtmuth =

Czech stationery company

Koh-i-Noor a.s.
- Type: Joint-stock company
- Industry: Stationery
- Founded: 1790; 236 years ago
- Founder: Joseph Hardtmuth
- Headquarters: České Budějovice, Czech Republic
- Area served: Worldwide
- Products: Writing implements, art materials, office products
- Revenue: 792,757,000 Czech koruna (2017)
- Operating income: 112,959,000 Czech koruna (2017)
- Net income: 114,446,000 Czech koruna (2017)
- Total assets: 1,738,843,000 Czech koruna (2017)
- Owner: Vlastislav Bříza (since 2000)
- Number of employees: 640 (2017)
- Website: koh-i-noor.cz/en

Koh-i-Noor Hardtmuth a.s. is a Czech manufacturing company of stationery products, based in České Budějovice. Established in 1790, it is one of the oldest stationery companies in the world.

With four factories in its country of origin (České Budějovice, Městec Králové, Broumov, and Milevsko) and one in Bulgaria, the company manufactures and sells a wide range of writing implements, art materials, and office products, exporting them to more than 90 countries worldwide.

== History ==
The company was founded in 1790 by Joseph Hardtmuth (1758–1816) of Austria. In 1802, the company patented the first pencil lead made from a combination of kaolin and graphite.

In 1848, Joseph's sons, Karl and Ludwig, took over the family business, and the production was relocated to the Bohemian city of Budweis (České Budějovice, within the current Czech Republic). The products were given awards in many world exhibitions, including in 1855 in New York City, 1856, 1900 and 1925 in Paris, 1862 in London, 1882 in Vienna and 1905 in Milan.

At the 1889 World Fair in Paris, the Hardtmuths displayed their pencils rebranded as "Koh-I-Noor Hardtmuth". Each pencil was encased in a yellow cedar-wood barrel. The inspiration for the name was the Koh-i-Noor diamond (Persian for "Mountain of Light"), part of the Crown Jewels of the United Kingdom (confiscated from the area of Kohinoor in India, where the diamond originates), and the largest diamond in the world at the time.

After the Second World War, Koh-i-Noor Hardtmuth was nationalized. It became privately held in 1992. Since 2007, it has been a member of the Czech parent company KOH-I-NOOR Holding a.s.

Since 2000 the owner of the company is Vlastislav Bříza, who is its chairman. The previous owner was Petr Kellner.

The company has production facilities in more than 80 countries. It is also a contract manufacturer of small injection-moulded plastic products. Koh-i-Noor was a partner in making Jiří Barta's 2009 animated feature Toys In the Attic, and its pencils appear frequently throughout the film.

== Products ==
Koh-i-Noor's range of products include:

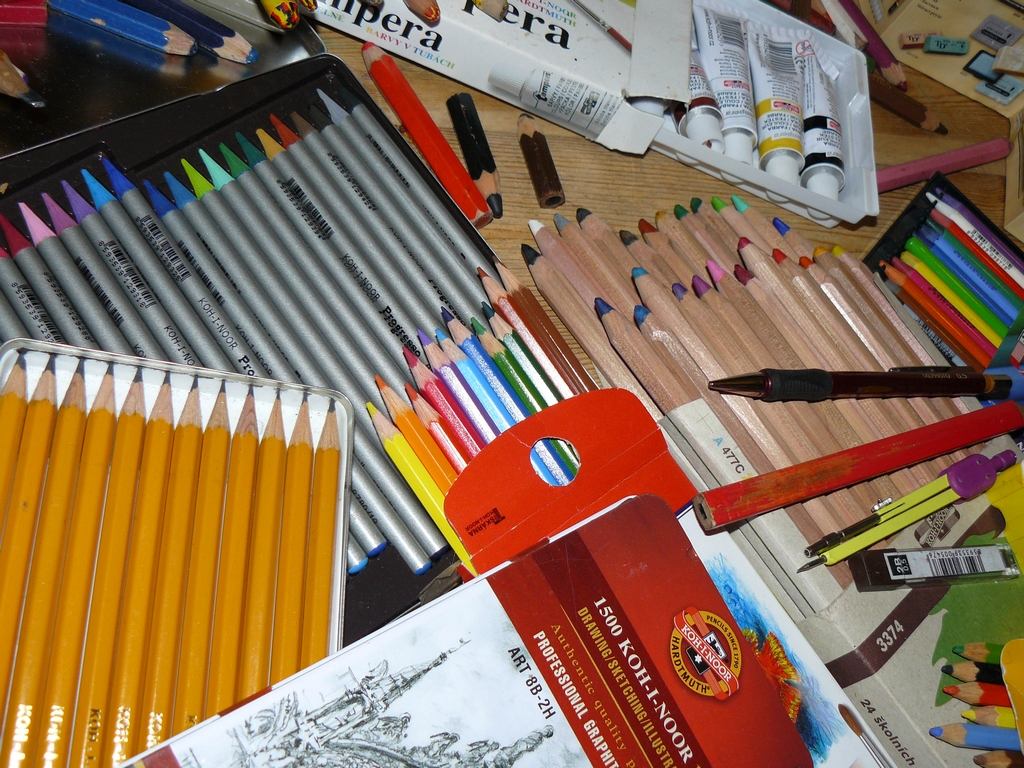
Some Koh-i-Noor products

Type	Products
Writing implements	Pencils, mechanical pencils, ballpoint pens, fountain pens, inks, marker pens, highlighters
Art materials	Colored pencils, chalks, pastels, modelling clay, acrylic paints, oil paints, watercolors, color inks, brushes
Accessories	Erasers, glue, pencil sharpeners, scissors
Geometrical tools	Rulers, set squares, protractor, French curves, scale rulers, templates, compasses
Office	Stamp pads, book covers, boxes
