= Musgrave Pencil Company =

American pencil manufacturer

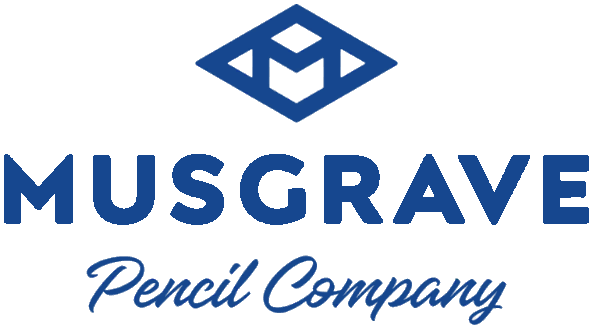

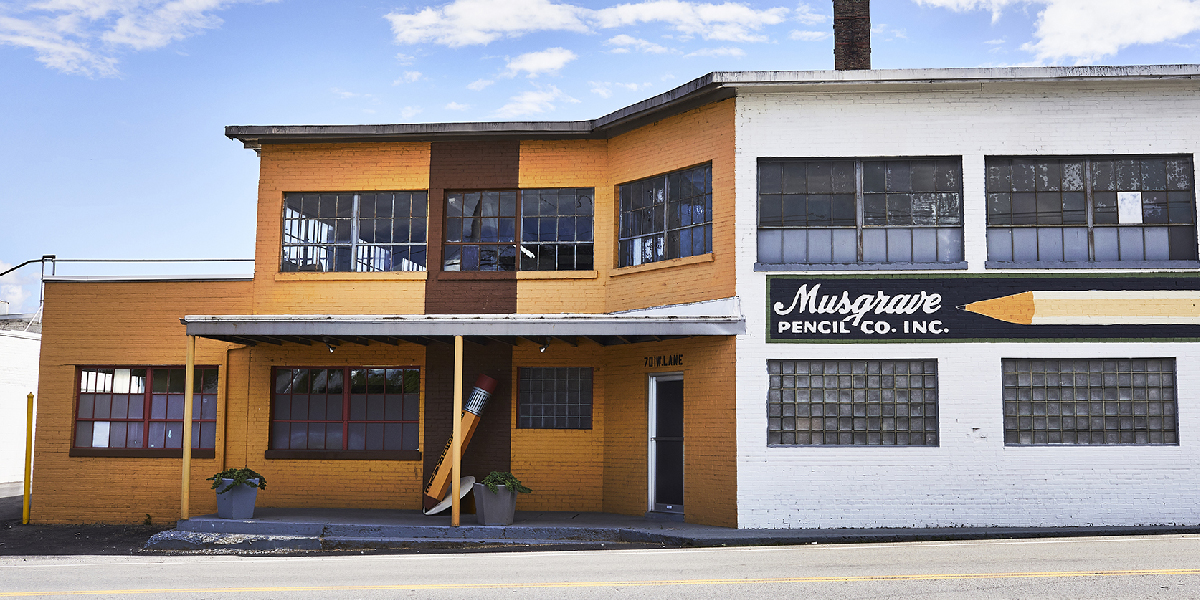
- Musgrave's factory in Shelbyville, Tennessee
- Industry: Stationery
- Founded: 1916; 110 years ago
- Founder: James Raford Musgrave
- Headquarters: Shelbyville, Tennessee, US
- Products: Pencils
- Website: musgravepencil.com

Musgrave Pencil Company is an American manufacturing company of pencils located in Shelbyville, Tennessee. They produce their own line of products as well as custom and white label pencils for other brands. One of only three remaining American producers of pencils, the recently rebranded and family-owned Musgrave is experiencing a renaissance at the beginning of the 21st century.

== History ==
=== Beginning ===
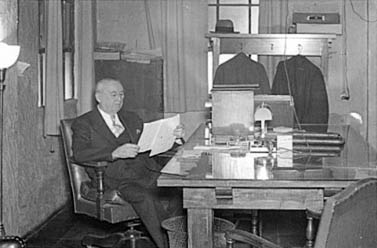
James Musgrave, founder

Musgrave Pencil Company was founded in 1916 by Col. James Raford Musgrave. He situated his new facility in Shelbyville, Tennessee, where there were many cedar rail fences, which were perfect for making pencil slats. Because of its straight grain, light weight, ease of shaping, and ability to resist rot, Red Cedar was the preferred source of wood for the pencil industry, dating back to the 19th century. The largest crops of these desirable trees grew in the Eastern half of the United States. Musgrave cut the cedar fences into pencil slats and exported them to European pencil manufacturers in burlap sacks via the port of New Orleans, five hundred miles from land-locked Middle Tennessee.

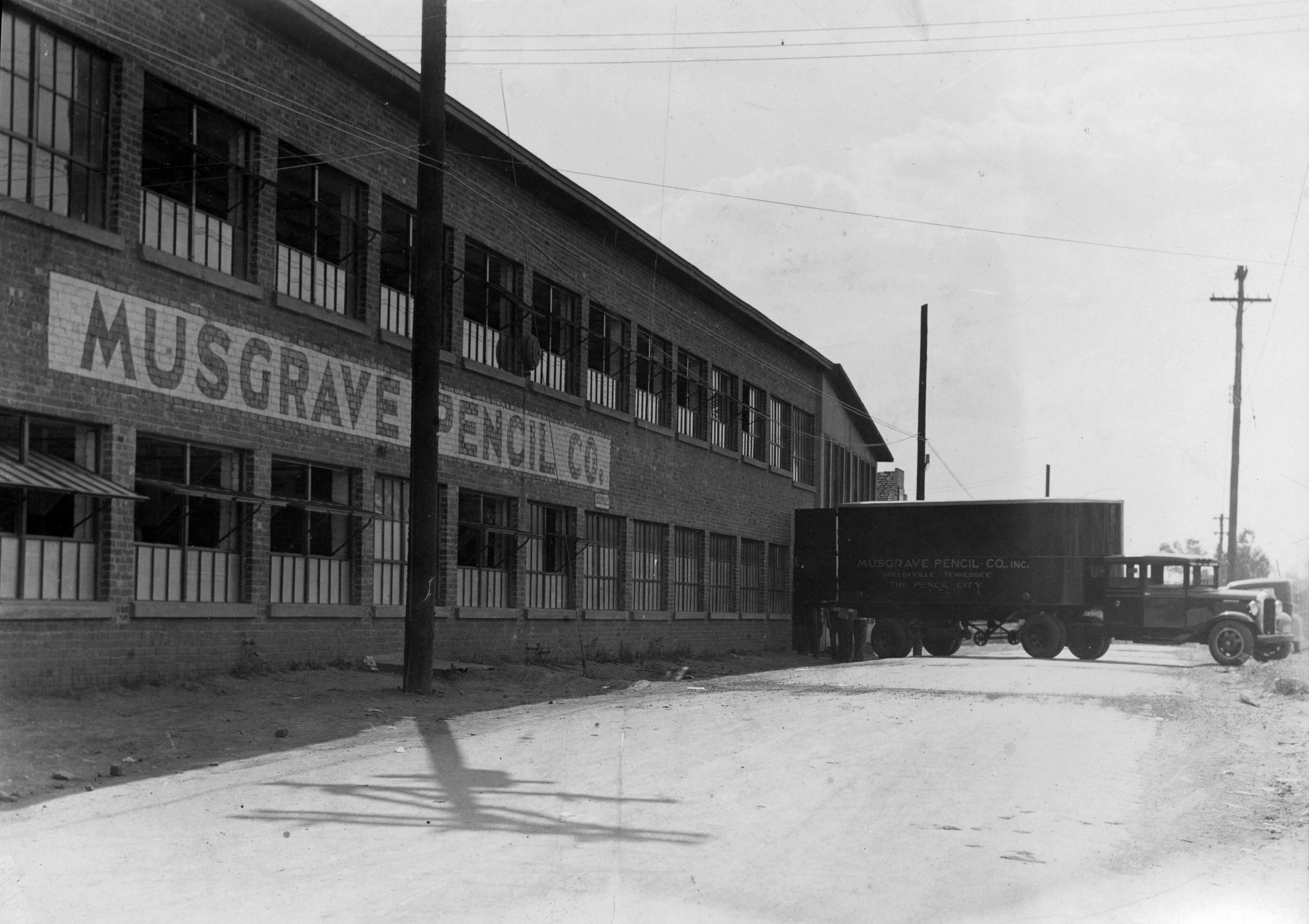
The Musgrave factory c. 1929

From 1916 to 1923, Musgrave employed a team of workers whose job was to gather cedar fence posts and rails. The weathered wood was ideal for making pencil slats, being already dried and straight. In many cases, the farmers were happy to exchange their old wooden fences for new wire fences, installed for them by Musgrave workers. When the cedar trees needed by pencil manufacturers became scarce, this source of cedar kept Musgrave in business producing their slats for export.

Musgrave found still another way to make a profit from cedar shavings, in the form of cedar oil. Factory workers distilled the aromatic oil from the non-usable parts of cedar rails and scraps. The company used copper distillery pots to extract the oil and sold it to perfume companies for use in their products.

The First World War disrupted the American pencil industry, as necessary supplies became difficult to find for pencil production. Further, companies like Musgrave that relied on exporting pencil slats found that their customers were unreachable.

=== Wood casing changes ===
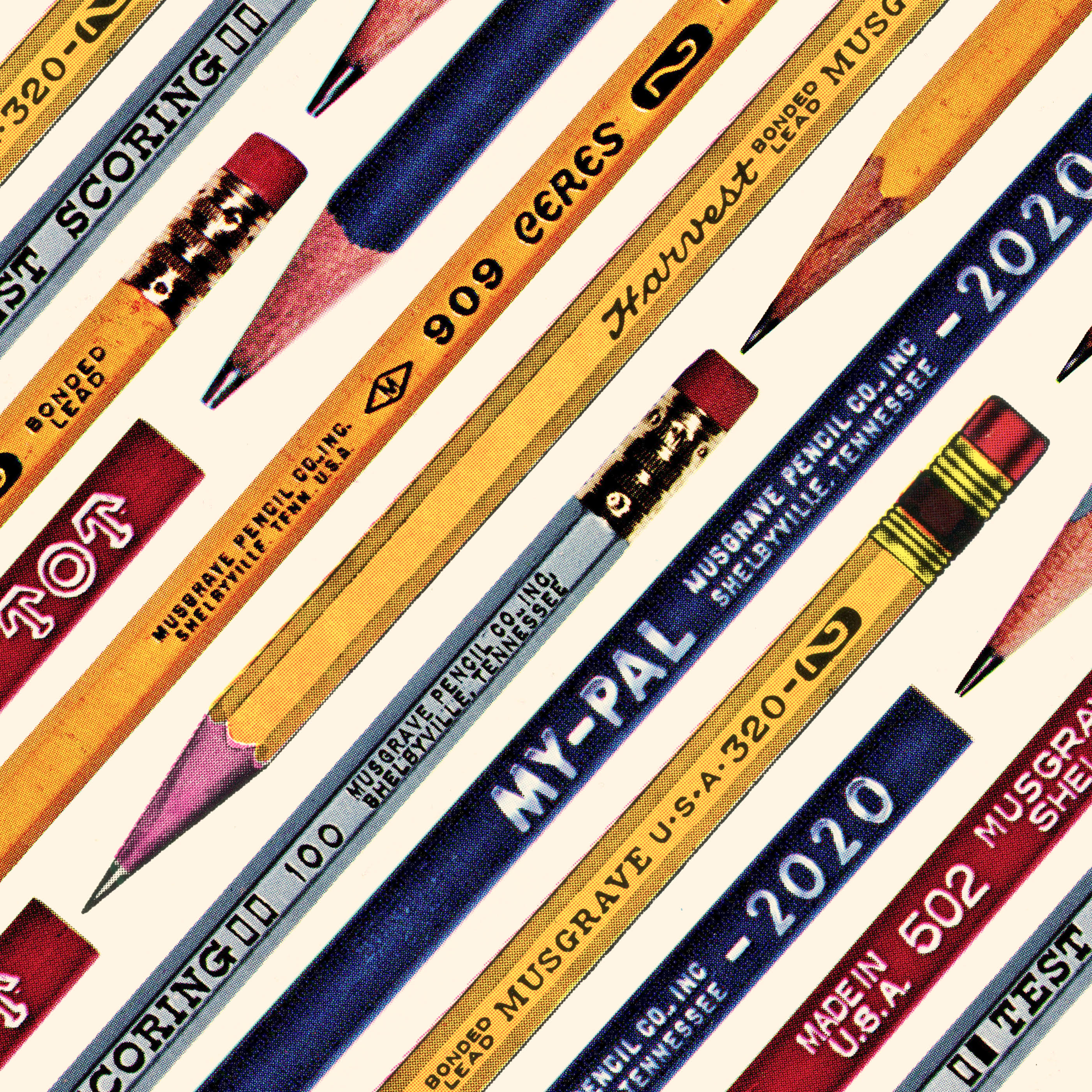
Some pencils from Musgrave's Heritage series

By the late 1920s, Tennessee Red Cedar became scarce, and the industry looked for a viable replacement. A Western species “incense-cedar, which grows abundantly in California and Oregon forests, was an ideal substitute for eastern red cedar as a pencil wood due to the ease of machining, sharpening, lacquering, and imprinting.” The wood traveled via train to Shelbyville, where workers would place it to be stacked and dried before being cut into pencil slats. Incense cedar soon became the standard species for high-quality pencils.

In the late 1950s to early 1960s, the furniture industry's demand for wood drove up the cost of lumber. As a result, maintaining an operation cutting slats from logs became economically unfeasible. Musgrave, like other manufacturers, began to produce its pencils from ready-made slats shipped from the West Coast, a practice continued to this day.

=== Pencil manufacturing ===
Musgrave began to produce its own pencils in 1923. After the Treaty of Versailles brought an end to the first World War and opened up trade with Europe again, Col. Musgrave traveled to Europe and bartered his wooden slats for pencil-making technology from Europe. When he returned to the United States, he brought with him the machinery necessary to produce pencils of his own back in Tennessee. In nearby St. Louis, he found a German machinist who could operate the intricate machinery, and he helped Musgrave to set up shop in Shelbyville.

The Depression years were tough on the pencil industry, but Musgrave found a way to increase its business when consumers were buying fewer pencils. Musgrave helped to pave the way for advertising pencils, and that became a large part of Musgrave's operation.

During WWII and the material rationing imposed on pencil manufacturers by the United States government, women kept the Musgrave factory running. They continued making the pencils that a nation at war still needed for its writing and educational needs while Musgrave's male employees were fighting in Europe and the Pacific.

Several other pencil manufacturers set up shop in Shelbyville. Empire Pencil Company moved their factory from New York to Shelbyville. Musgrave helped the fellow pencil company to get their own factory up and running right across the street from the Musgrave factory. In the 1950s, the half-dozen pencil makers headquartered in Shelbyville inspired Tennessee Governor Buford Ellington to name the town The Pencil City. Generations of factory workers employed by Musgrave and other companies scented the air of Shelbyville with the smell of wood and paint.

=== Decrease in American pencil production ===
This changed in the early 1990s, as Chinese pencil manufacturers began to undercut domestic production. These inexpensively produced and exported pencils flooded the American market and gutted the pencil industry. This forced Musgrave to cut salaries across the board and to lay off some employees, while other companies in The Pencil City closed up or moved production overseas.

American slat manufacturers began to export their logs to China, where they would be cut into pencil slats and then shipped to the remaining pencil manufacturers in the United States. Musgrave continues to purchase some of its pencil slats from the West Coast. This is usually, but not always, American wood sent to China and then received back cut into slats. Most of Musgrave's pencil production is from basswood (a common species used for pencil production as an alternative to cedar), but some of their custom pencils are made of the western incense cedar species.

=== Present Day ===
Musgrave has operated largely unseen in recent decades, producing white-label pencils for advertising purposes and also for other brands. They have maintained a “heritage” series of pencils, and these have received increased attention in recent years. Currently about 90 employees work in the Musgrave factory and office.

Underscoring its dedication to Tennessee, in 2019, Musgrave became the first pencil manufacturer to make pencils out of Red Cedar in nearly a century.

Under its own brand, Musgrave currently produces more than a dozen different models of pencils for school-aged students, as well as high-quality pencils for the office environment. They make graded artists’ pencils and two premium pencils, the Tennessee Red and the Harvest Pro. Custom pencils are still a large portion of Musgrave's business model, and they produce round and hexagonal pencils for their customers, as well as carpenter, golf, jumbo, and thinner bridge pencils.

In the midst of a renaissance of analog means of communication and renewed interest in handwriting in education, the arts, and psychological development, pencils in general are increasingly preferred to digital alternatives for note taking and other exercises in learning. Custom-printed and heritage Musgrave pencils can be found in many American schools.
