= Joseph Hardtmuth =

Austrian architect, inventor and entrepreneur

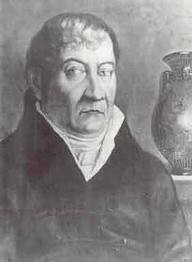
Josef Hardtmuth

Joseph Hardtmuth (13 February 1758 – 23 May 1816) was an Austrian architect, inventor and entrepreneur.

== Inventions ==
Hardtmuth was born on 13 February 1758 in Asparn an der Zaya. In 1789, he invented a new kind of earthenware with a lead-free glaze for tableware production, the so-called Vienna ware. In 1810, he invented an artificial pumice and years later, a version of stoneware which was used to make mortars, funnels, and other utensils. A flexible, unbreakable blackboard was also produced.

In 1792, Hardtmuth established a pencil factory in Vienna after he succeeded in creating an artificial graphite pencil by mixing powdered graphite with clay. Until that time, whole pieces, cut from graphite, were glued in between wood and were imported from England. With the new method, graphite of inferior quality could be used in pencil manufacturing, lowering the price and making the product more accessible for the masses. His company Koh-i-Noor Hardtmuth still exists.

The extensive Liechtenstein possessions led him to Bohemia, Moravia and again to Lower Austria as building director. He was commissioned with the conversion of farm buildings and castles, the construction of schools and patron churches and other construction measures such as the creation and design of landscape gardens. He built i.a. Obelisks, triumphal arches, exotic buildings and artificial ruins. In 1811 there was a construction accident when a lookout tower collapsed on the Kleiner Anninger during construction. This incident led to the end of his work as princely building director in 1812.

Hardtmuth died on 23 May 1816 in Vienna.
