= Blackwing =

Blackwing or Black Wings may refer to:

== Entertainment ==
- Black Wings (film), a 1963 Polish film

=== Fictional characters ===
- Blackwing (Marvel Comics), the name of two fictional Marvel Comics supervillains and one hero
- Blackwing (DC Comics), a character from DC Comics
- Blackwing, one of the characters of The Order of the Stick webcomic
- Blackwing, a Transformer from Power of the Primes

=== Music ===
- Blackwing (song), from the CSS album Donkey
- Black Wings (album), by Wolf
- Blackwing Studios, an English recording studio
- Black Wing, a musical project by Dan Barrett

== Vehicular ==
- Blackwing Sweden Blackwing, a Swedish ultralight and light-sport aircraft from Blackwing Sweden
- Cadillac twin-turbo V8 (aka "Blackwing")
- AeroVironment Blackwing, a miniature United States Navy unmanned aerial vehicle used for ISR and communications.

== Other ==
- Blackwing 602, a type of pencil
- EHC Black Wings Linz, Austrian hockey team

== See also ==
- Black Wings of Destiny, the second studio album by the Black metal band Dragonlord
