= 58 Kent Street =

Building in Brooklyn, New York

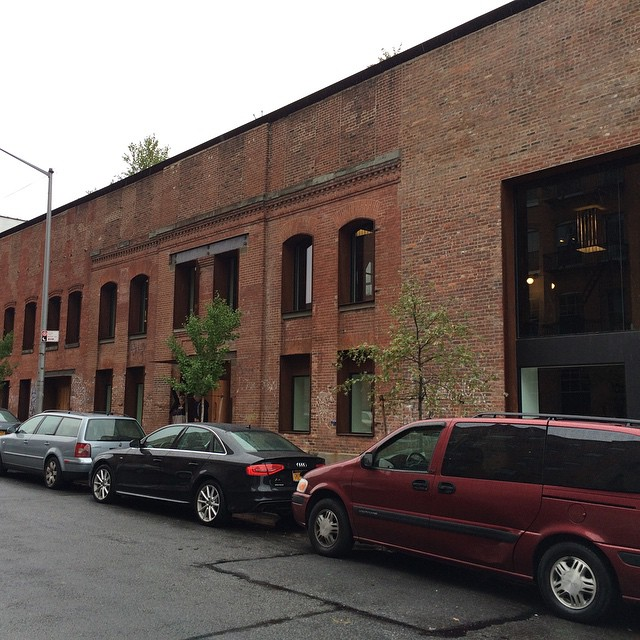
- Building façade, October 2014

General information
- Location: 58 Kent Street, Brooklyn, New York, United States
- Coordinates: 40°43′49″N 73°57′32″W

Technical details
- Floor area: 29,000 ft^{2} (2,700 m^{2})

Design and construction
- Architect: Ole Sondresen

58 Kent Street is a three-story, open plan building in Greenpoint, Brooklyn, in New York City. It is part of the Eberhard Faber Pencil Factory historic district, a complex that operated in the late 19th and early 20th centuries. The crowdfunding platform Kickstarter purchased the building in 2011 and completed an extensive renovation. Kickstarter staff worked there from 2014 through the COVID-19 pandemic, during which the company transitioned to a fully remote workforce.

The early 2010s renovation preserved the shell of the building, which was all that remained from its prior owner. The work to restore the façade and retain its arrested decay received two New York-based awards. In the signature sustainable and arboreal style of the renovation's architect, Ole Sondresen, the project adaptively reused the building's frame and recycled other materials sourced locally. Sondresen designed the headquarters around a central, glass courtyard. Designer Camille Finefrock, who also was responsible for the interior design, outfitted the courtyard with native ferns and shrubs. The space includes a rooftop garden, library, 74-seat theater, and was designed to afford staff a variety of workspace options.

The building's street faces are composed of three different façades in graffitied red brick, constructed from right to left, starting with the Italianate style of a factory built in 1860 and purchased by Faber a decade later. Faber hired the Brooklyn architect Theobald Engelhardt to make the center façade in Renaissance Revival style. The easternmost portion was built in the German Romanesque Revival style. The renovators repaired and shored this mismatched façade to preserve rather than overwrite the anachronistic updates it had received since its creation. The façade restorers studied each deteriorated joint to create replacement mortar equivalent in composition.

== History ==
Eberhard Faber, the great-grandson of pencil entrepreneur Kaspar Faber, traveled to the United States, where he bought Eastern redcedar and, in New York City, opened a stationery store and the country's first pencil factory. The factory was established in eastern Midtown Manhattan in 1866, near the current site of the headquarters of the United Nations. However, after a factory fire in 1872, Faber established the new Eberhard Faber Pencil Factory at a larger location in Greenpoint, Brooklyn. That complex expanded to eight buildings through the 1890s. Faber's children split the company from its German parent in 1898 and remained in Greenpoint until 1956, when it moved to Pennsylvania. The New York City Landmarks Preservation Commission designated the complex as the Eberhard Faber Historic District in 2008.

Kickstarter was in contract to purchase a portion of the complex by 2011 and finalized its purchase the next year. The two-story, 29,000 ft^{2} (2,700 m^{2}) building had been gutted by its previous owner in the mid-1980s with failed plans of creating a high-rise hotel and nine-story addition. Kickstarter, which was founded two years prior, purchased the building for US$3.6 million and planned to spend an additional US$3.9 million on its renovation, as a portion of US$10 million it had raised through a recent venture round. Kickstarter co-founder and chairman Perry Chen said that their choice of investment in real estate reflected the company's long-term outlook, as they hoped to remain there in perpetuity. The choice to for the company to purchase its own building was rare among Internet startups, as was the choice to relocate away from Manhattan to a nondescript, industrial area of Brooklyn. The company had previously rented three narrow floors of a dilapidated tenement building in Manhattan's Lower East Side.

=== Construction and opening ===
Kickstarter's renovation plans were unanimously approved by the city's Landmarks Preservation Commission in March 2012 and praised by community officials. Construction had begun by January 2013 and staff moved in a year later, in January 2014. Kickstarter opened its headquarters with a public block party and art show in April. The company hosted a Killer Queen arcade cabinet for the block party and continued to house it afterwards. Sondresen, the architect, gave a public tour of the building in October.

The restoration received awards from the New York Landmarks Conservancy and Municipal Art Society.

=== Sale ===
Kickstarter remained a distributed company following the COVID-19 pandemic, and all employees had remote work arrangements. By 2022, the property was listed for sale at $29.5 million, later reduced to $25 million. A writer for Curbed said the listing "demotes the 29,000-square-foot space from its 2010s status as an example of where office design was heading to its contemporary state as a fossil of how we once worked".

== Design ==
External videos
- Short video in which the architect discusses the project

All that remained of the building, when purchased by Kickstarter, was its raw shell in arrested decay. Behind its graffitied red brick façade, light shined through holes in its makeshift roof to illuminate a space where pigeons flew and rainwater puddled. Ole Sondresen, the Norwegian-born, New York-based architect behind the renovation, recalled how the building evoked a "dramatic and magical" feeling and, in his signature sustainable and arboreal style, sought to retain as much of its experience and materials as possible.

Sondresen adaptively reused multiple elements of the remaining building. He bordered a multi-floor, central courtyard using the roof's original, industrial trusses, and hung the courtyard's window façades off of repurposed trusses. Around the building's entrance, Sondresen kept the historic lintels, bollards, and arches. Separately, another architect worked to preserve the mismatched, dilapidated façade. For the externally sourced building materials, Sondresen chose sustainable options to reduce the construction's carbon footprint: reclaimed wood, recycled denim for insulation, and recycled fly ash in the building's concrete. The theater's seats were recovered from a shuttered Midwest venue. Sondresen estimated that the majority of construction materials came from a 20-mile radius.

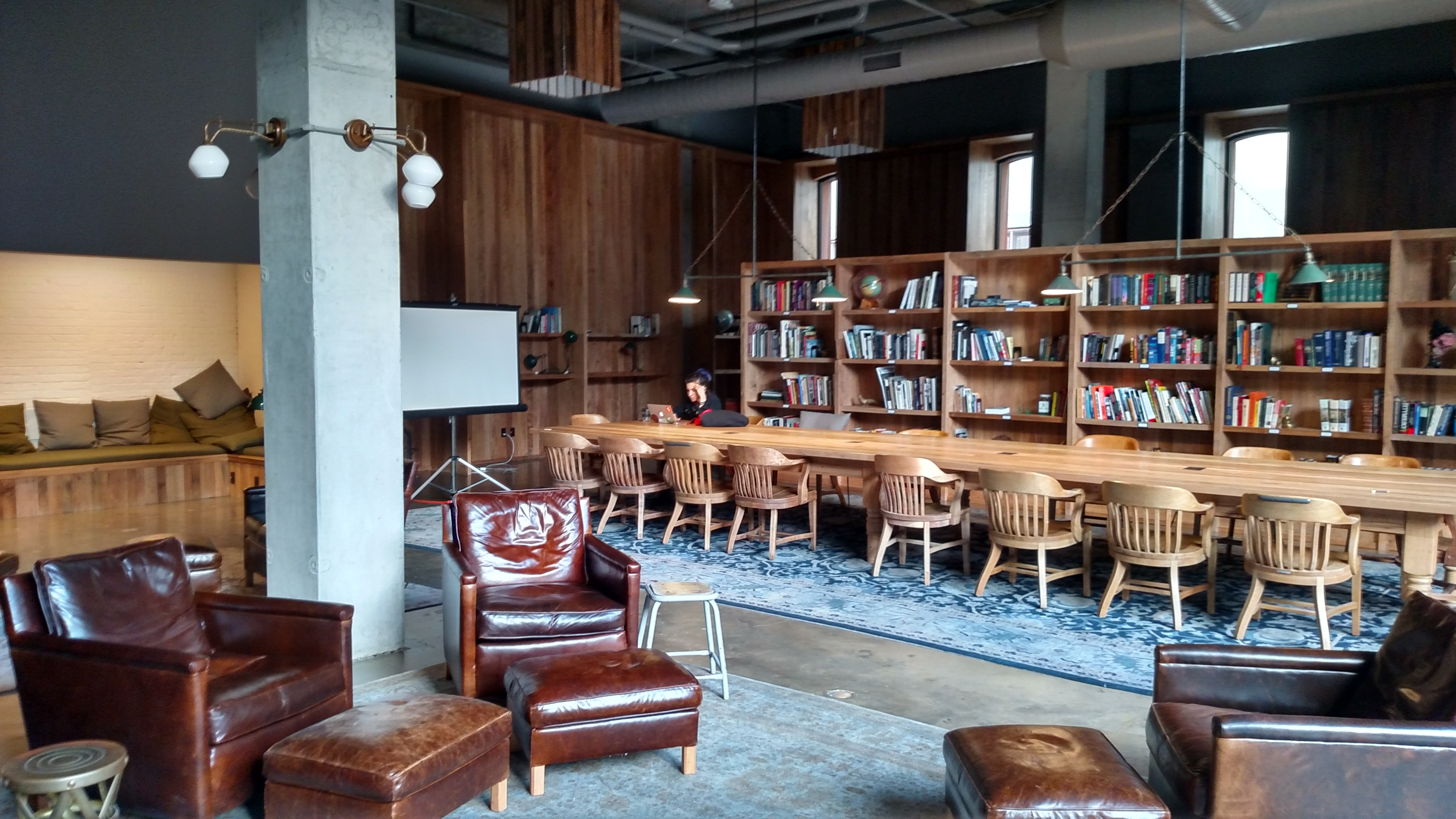
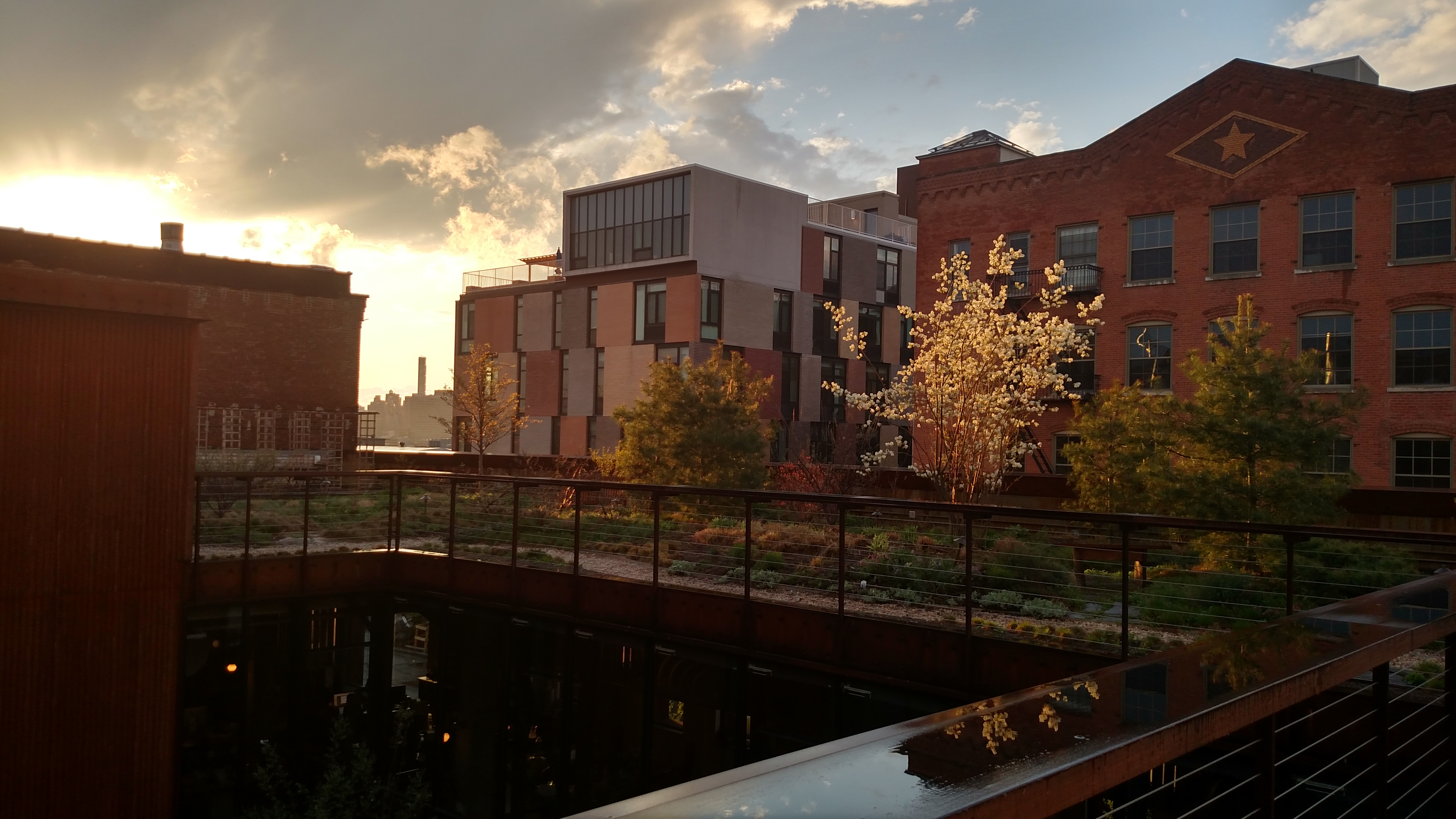
The library and rooftop garden in winter

Camille Finefrock designed the building's gardens and interiors. The courtyard garden at the heart of the building was designed as a serene "portrait of the woods" for staff to connect with the nature that historically grew at the building's site through their nearest window. The courtyard features plants indigenous to Long Island and the Northeast, with ferns, swamp azalea, river birches, and a meditation stone beneath a redbud tree. Sondresen compared the layout to a Renaissance palazzo where the building is lit from inside: Three of the courtyard's four walls are glass, and the fourth is patinated Corten steel with a Japanese-style rain chain. Finefrock designed the rooftop garden in sandy soil to reflect the building's indigenous environment and its proximity to the ocean, with elements from the Long Island Pine Barrens, coastal plants, beach plum trees. A gravel path divides in two and allows a user the choice between a direct route across the roof or a more meandering enclosed philosopher's walk. Also on the roof are fruit, vegetable, and cut flower gardens for staff to collect blueberries, kale, tomatoes, and flowers for their desks. Inside, Finefrock chose vintage furniture, topographical maps and brass animals to complement the full library of books that she sourced from the estate of Frank H. Pearl, investor and founder of Perseus Books Group. Custom standing lamps illuminate leather reading chairs, a small cabinet of curiosities holds a rotating selection of objects evoking a sense of wonder befitting of factories for creative technology, both pencils and Kickstarter.

The building was designed to accommodate a variety of working styles and give staff multiple options for places to work. It follows an open plan layout common to startups, with rows of long work tables for staff to share. Alternatively, staff can work by preference at more private spaces around the office: an individual carrel or armchair in the library, a rattan lounge chair in the rooftop solarium, the meditation stone in the center courtyard, the wooden bleachers, and standing desks. The meeting rooms ranged from cozy spaces for small groups with mid-century loveseats to spacious conference rooms. There is also a deck on the roof for working outdoors and screening films.

The building's third story, its basement, was built for operations and public programming, with a kitchen, gallery space, and theater. Woodworkers built kitchen banquettes made of reclaimed wood as homage to the restaurant where the company's co-founders originally met a decade earlier. The 1,600-square-foot gallery was designed to host community events and artists. The 74-seat, Western redcedar-paneled theater hosts presentations, screenings, and performances for the company and outside creators.

=== Façade ===
The property purchased by Kickstarter and designated as 58 Kent Street is composed of three separate façades. The westernmost portion of the building, or its right side when facing its entrance, was part of an Italianate-style factory designed by Philemon Tillion in 1860. Faber moved his factory to the location from lower Manhattan in 1872 and commissioned the Brooklyn architect Theobald Engelhardt to make the center façade c. 1895. The Renaissance Revival section uses brick dentil courses and corbels, cast iron lintels, radiating brick arches, and bluestone water tables. The easternmost (left) portion follows the German Romanesque Revival style, featuring jutting brick header arches above the windows, cast iron lintels above the doors, and iron shutter hinges. The pediments above the latter two sections show the pencil company's logo.

Kickstarter's leaders liked the mismatched, dilapidated façade and hired New York City architect Scott Henson to assess whether it could be preserved. While historic preservation typically entails a return to the original condition, Henson was instead asked to keep its graffiti layers, different mortar types, broken bricks, and anachronistic masonry repairs while ensuring the façade's structural stability and waterproofing. The architect and preservation consultants surveyed every seam in the façade and chose mortars that would replicate the originals. Another contractor assessed for structural soundness.

The restorers then cut and repointed mortar joints based on a threshold of deterioration, and repaired other minor holes with spot pointing. Though the base of the central, Engelhardt-designed façade had more than 30 percent brick erosion, their joints were selectively repointed and bricks coated with water repellent, so as to preserve the existing brick face. The restorers preserved the graffiti on the brick faces but not on the repointed mortar. The brickwork in the building's rear was completely rather than selectively repointed to save money. Contemporary glass windows and Corten steel window boxes replaced their formerly closed apertures, and a minimalist Corten steel overhang signals the building's entrance on an otherwise unassuming façade.

== Closure of headquarters and sale ==
In 2025, Kickstarter closed operations at 58 Kent Street housing their global headquarters and sold the building for $17 million to Aperture Holdings and the Greenmont Group.
