= Later... with Jools Holland =

British music television programme

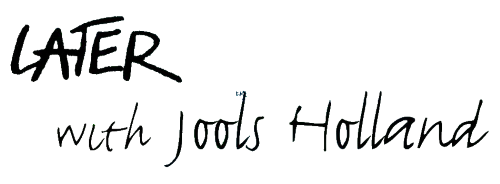
- Genre: Entertainment
- Created by: BBC
- Directed by: Janet Fraser Crook
- Presented by: Jools Holland
- Starring: various
- Country of origin: United Kingdom
- Original language: English
- No. of series: 69
- No. of episodes: 466 (list of episodes)

Production
- Production locations: BBC Television Centre (1992–2012, 2019); The Maidstone Studios (2013–2018); Helicon Mountain/various locations (2020-2021); Alexandra Palace Theatre (2022–present)
- Running time: 60 minutes (pre-recorded version, 1992–2018; Even Later, 2019; BBC Four compilations 2022); 30 minutes (live version, 2008–2018; pre-recorded version, 2019); 45-50 minutes (2020–present)
- Production companies: BBC Studios; BBC Music

Original release
- Network: BBC Two
- Release: 8 October 1992 – present

Related
- Jools' Annual Hootenanny (1994–present); The Late Show (1989–1995); The Old Grey Whistle Test (1971–1988)

Later... with Jools Holland (previously known as Even Later... with Jools Holland, Later Live... with Jools Holland and ...Later with Jools Holland) is a contemporary British music television show hosted by Jools Holland. The show features a mixture of both established and new musical artists, from solo performers to bands and larger ensembles.

A spin-off of The Late Show, the show has been running in short series since 8 October 1992. The day of transmission has varied over the years - it was usually recorded on a Tuesday for Saturday broadcast; as of 2025, it is shown on Sunday nights. The show is considered an institution, having millions of fans around the world. It is currently broadcast in America on MTV Live (formerly known as Palladia); previously it had been shown on Ovation, BBC America, Fuse, and Dave. The Ovation and Fuse broadcasts leave out several performances (and usually one or two performers entirely) to air commercials within a one-hour timeslot. It is also shown in Australia on the UKTV channel and ABC2, in Canada on HIFI and AUX TV, in Germany on ZDFkultur, in Spain on Canal+ Xtra, in Croatia on HRT 2, in Latin America on Film&Arts and in Belgium, France, Portugal, Switzerland, and the United Arab Emirates on iConcerts HD, and in Ireland on TG4.

The 200th programme was broadcast on 1 February 2008. The 250th edition was broadcast in September 2010.

== Programme format ==
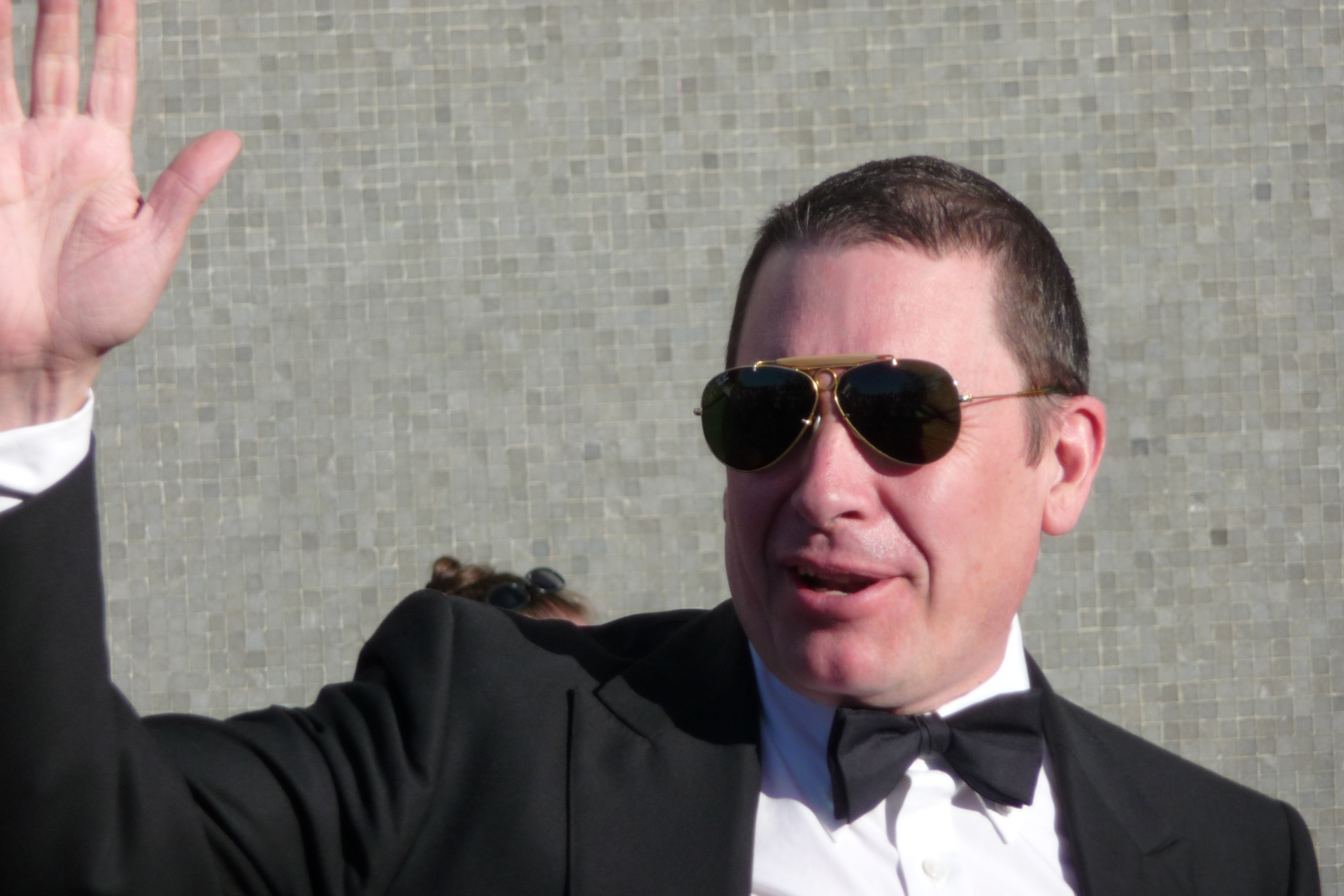
Jools Holland at the British Academy Television Awards 2009

Later... draws from a diverse palette of both popular and world music, and each show features around five to seven acts with a variety of styles performing for each other and a studio audience of around 300 people. Jools Holland introduces the show and interviews one or more of the performers. A unique feature is the short jam session that begins each show, involving all of his invited guests, along with Holland on piano. This beginning jam session also best shows the unusual layout of the set – all the bands are arrayed in a circle with the audience filling in the gaps between them. Holland often also accompanies his guests' performances, with mixed results – Mark E. Smith of the Fall insisted that he would only appear on the show if Holland would promise not to play piano over any of his songs. The international singer Anastacia performed live along Holland on the piano the non-single song "Ask Of You". Over time, these jam sessions have changed - the end of the hour-long show ends with a jam session until the end of Series 53; shows since Series 54 no longer feature any jam sessions.

On 1 April 2008, with the start of Series 32, a new format was debuted, featuring a 30-minute, fully live show broadcast on a Tuesday, Later Live... with Jools Holland, followed by the original hour-long pre-recorded show, Later... with Jools Holland, typically broadcast on a Friday. The Friday show features the performances recorded on a Tuesday as well as others recorded during the session for the live show. The HD hour-long broadcasts are mixed in Dolby Digital 5.1, which adds to the overall ambience of the studio environment. For Series 51, the hour-long show was moved to Saturday nights, before moving to Sunday nights for Series 52 and 53.

After the 2012 closure of BBC Television Centre for redevelopment, production from April 2013 moved to Studio 1 at The Maidstone Studios, close to Holland's home in Cooling, Kent. This would remain to be the show's filming location until the end of Series 53 in 2018.

=== 2018-present ===
Later... and Jools' Annual Hootenanny were opened up to tender in 2018, with the contract to produce the show being retained by BBC Studios. A number of changes were made to the show's format, with the 60-minute show having a more relaxed feel, including "bespoke films and backstage interviews". Each 60-minute programme also saw Holland joined by a special guest to co-host. The 54th series of the programme saw it return to Television Centre, where it had been filmed since its inception until 2012. It was filmed in TC1, the largest studio on the site. For this series, both editions were pre-recorded on the same day. The 30-minute edition aired Thursday night at 10pm, with the 60-minute Even Later... edition airing Friday night, usually at around 11pm to midnight, as part of BBC Two's post-Newsnight late-night line-up.

In 2020, the format was changed due to the COVID-19 pandemic, with Holland introducing guests via videolink from his Helicon Mountain home studio and the programme becoming 45 minutes in length, as Newsnight was now starting at 10:45pm.

After a number of years where the show had been broadcast on Tuesday and Friday nights, in October 2021, series 59 started to be broadcast on a Saturday, still in a 45 minute format, at around 10pm, as part of a BBC Two schedule block devoted to music programming. In 2022, with the return of the in-person format, the programme moved to a new permanent location at the restored Alexandra Palace Theatre in North London, with Wet Leg, Joe Bonamassa and Cat Burns appearing on the first episode of Series 60 - the first series recorded at this location. The show moved to a Sunday night time slot starting with Series 66.

== Special editions ==
Occasional special editions of the show showcase a major artist under the Later... banner, with the Later presents... title. Artists featured in these shows have included Alice in Chains in 1992, Paul Weller and Metallica in 1996, R.E.M. and the Verve in 1998, Oasis in 2000, Radiohead in 2001 and 2007, and the Red Hot Chili Peppers in 2007. The bands in question play for the duration of the hour-long show. Despite the different name, the show is still introduced by Jools Holland and takes place in a similarly set-up studio.

The special episode featuring M People in 1998 was later released on video and DVD under the title One Night in Heaven. Also, a selection of the songs from the programme have been released on the limited edition of The Best of M People album and as a b-side to the single "Dreaming".

Special editions broadcast on New Year's Eve each year are referred to as Jools Holland's Hootenanny and are pre-recorded, typically in early December. In 2003 a 'Spring Hootenanny' was broadcast, which proved to be a one-off.

In 2017, to celebrate the 25th anniversary of the show, a Later 25 show was held at London's Royal Albert Hall - it was recorded on 21 September 2017 and broadcast two days later on the 23rd. The setup was roughly similar, with bands located around the arena of the Hall with some artists also on the stage. The 2 hour long show featured 10 artists.

Repeated excerpts from the show were broadcast under the title A Little Later as fill-in programmes on BBC HD, while in 2022, BBC Four had a number of new Later compilations made for the channel, themed around various musical genres like pop or musical collaborations.

In 2022, the programme celebrated 30 years on air with a special "30th Birthday Bash" episode, recorded at London’s Eventim Apollo in London. It was then followed by the special "The A-Z of Later... with Jools Holland: From Adele to ZZ Top, narrated by comedian Paul Whitehouse.

== Criticism ==
In 2008, the head rock and pop critic of The Guardian, Alexis Petridis, claimed the programme featured a "distinct lack of spontaneity" and was failing to showcase enough dance music, pop, hip-hop, experimental music or present R&B artists. He also argued "all the artists it breaks are essentially the same: MOR singer-songwriters".

In 2010, Joe Elliott, lead singer of rock band Def Leppard, criticised the programme for excluding the band from appearing on it, claiming "Jools Holland won't have us on his show because we're not cool enough."

== Accolades ==
In 2000, the series was ranked at number 81 in the British Film Institute's list of the "BFI TV 100", listing the top 100 British television programmes of the 20th century.

== Discography ==
Numerous albums containing performances from the show have been released over the course of the show's run.

- 1996 ...Later Volume One: Brit Beat
- 1996 ...Later with Jools Holland Volume Two: Slow Beats
- 2008 Later... with Jools Holland The First 15 Years
- 2008 Later... with Jools Holland Live
- 2009 Later... with Jools Holland Live 2

Music DVDs have also been released, listed below:

- 2003 Later... with Jools Holland Hootenanny
- 2003 Later... with Jools Holland Giants
- 2003 Later... with Jools Holland Louder
- 2005 Later... with Jools Holland Even Louder
- 2005 Later with Jools Holland: World
- 2006 Later... with Jools Holland Mellow
- 2006 Best of Later... with Jools Holland
- 2008 Later... with Jools Holland The First 15 Years
- Two DVDs subtitled Cool Britannia

== See also ==
- The Tube
