= Alexandra Palace Theatre =

Venue in Haringey, North London

Coordinates: 51.5945°N 0.1296°W

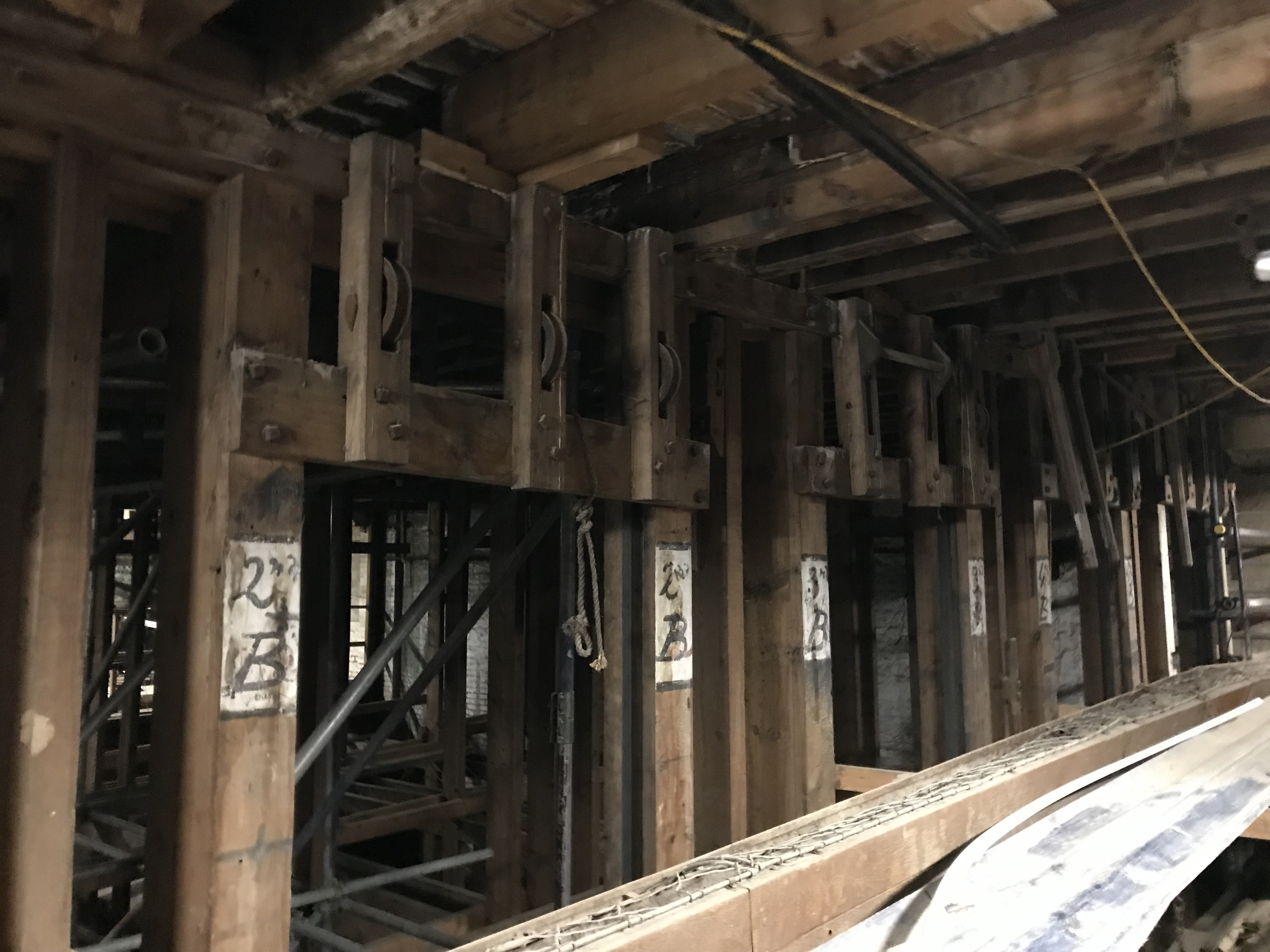
Stage machinery

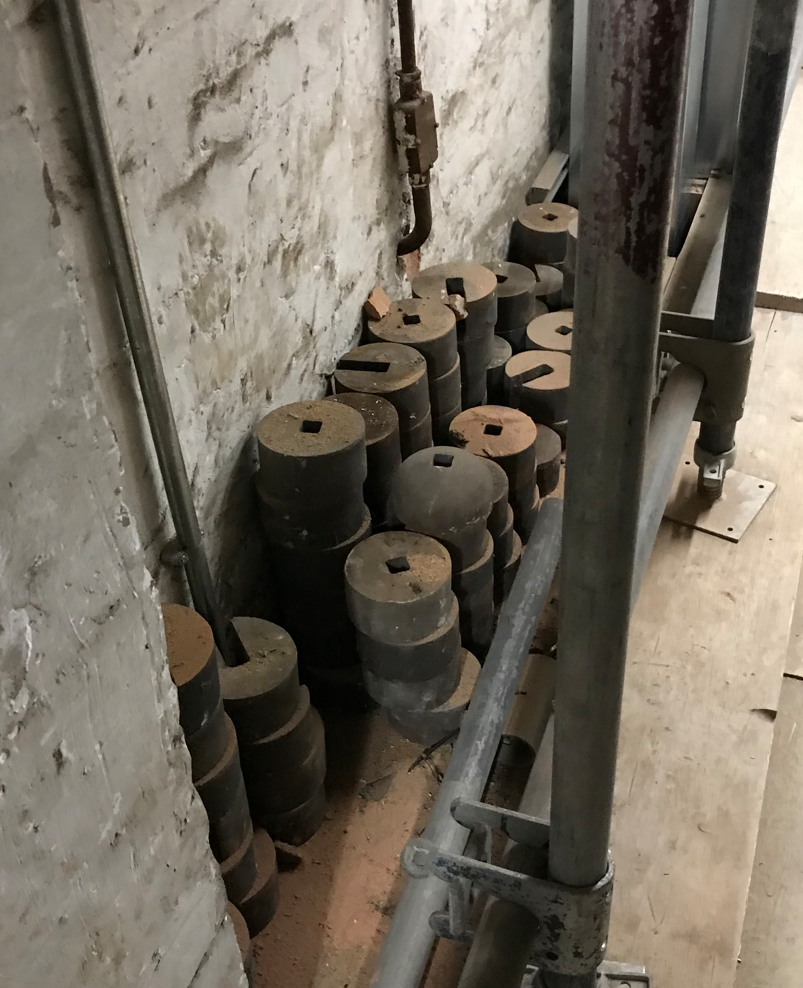
Weights used with stage machinery

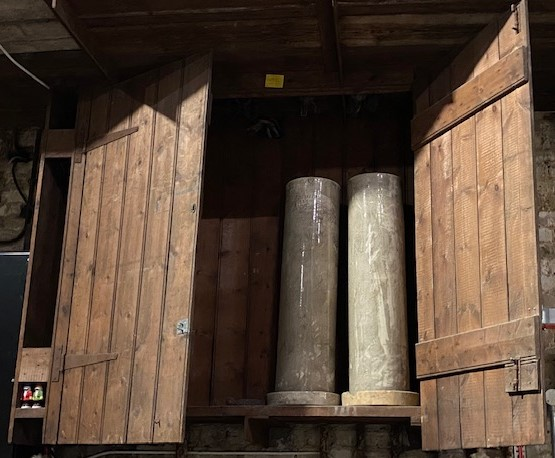
Salt water dimmers backstage at Alexandra Palace Theatre

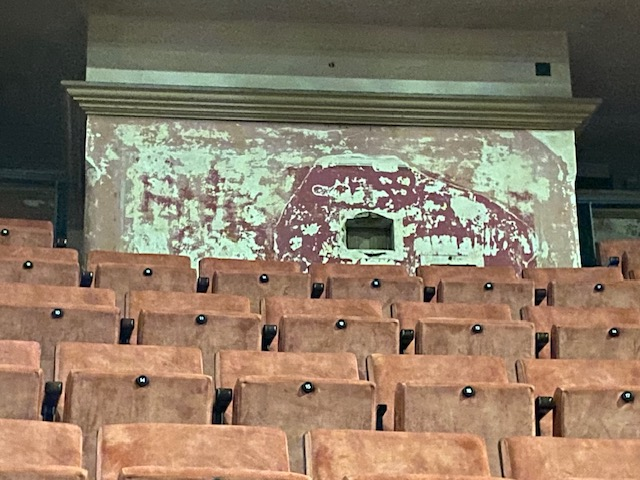
Film projector housing in Alexandra Palace Theatre

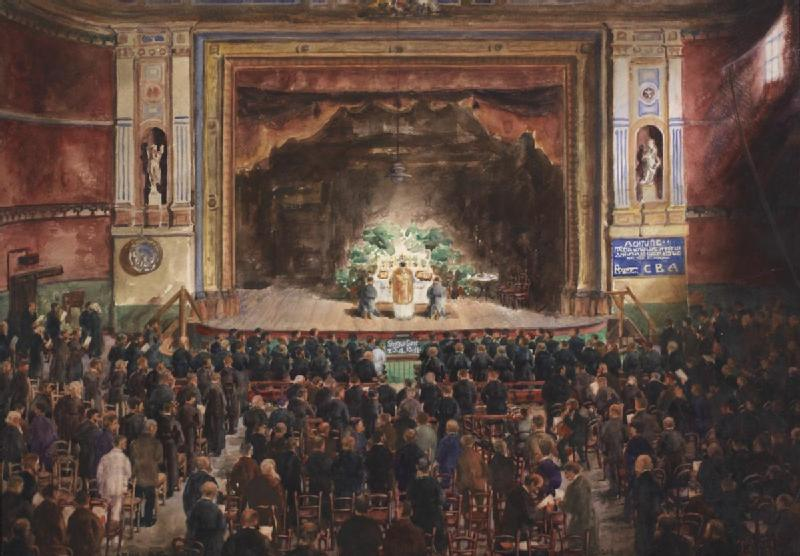
Sunday service in the theatre during WW1, painted by George Kenner, an internee,

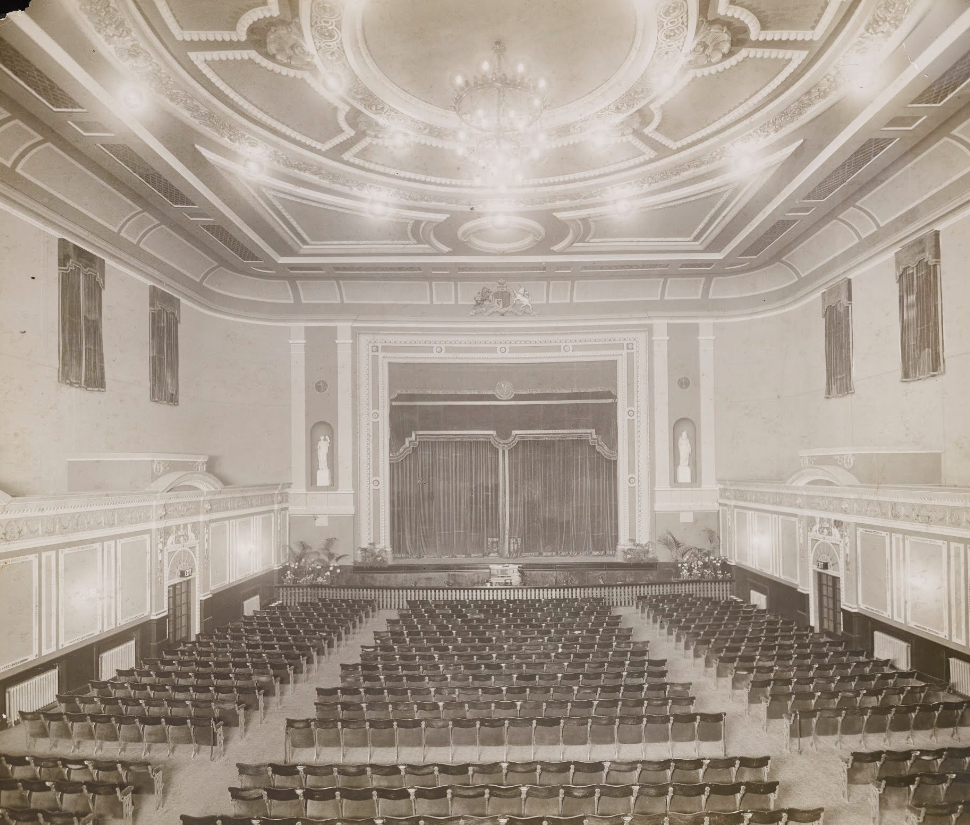
View of the stage from the theatre balcony after the 1922 refurbishment

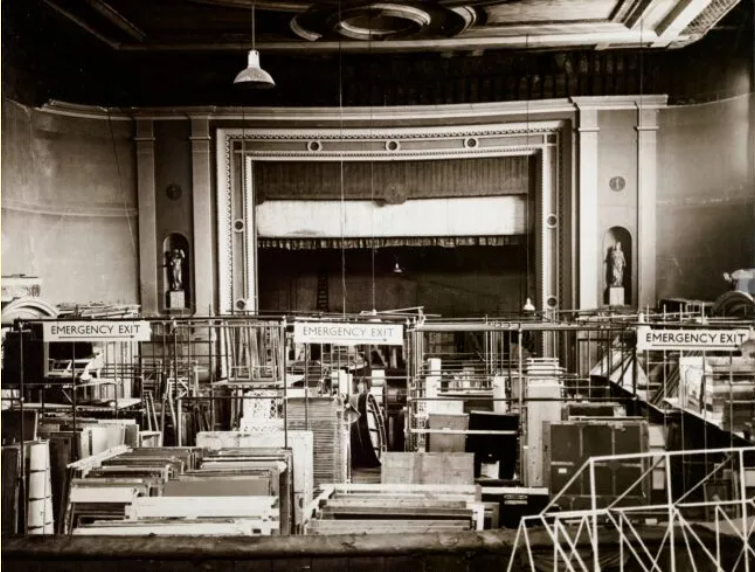
Theatre used by BBC as a prop store between 1935 and 1981

The Alexandra Palace Theatre was originally built in London, England, in 1873 for the performance of opera and ballet, but within a few weeks was burnt to the ground with the rest of Alexandra Palace. The Palace, including the theatre, was rebuilt and reopened in 1875 and is now a Grade II listed building. The new theatre included a 22-foot (6.7 m) cellar below the stage which housed complex machinery for use in scene changes and movement of actors. The theatre fell into disrepair for many years but was reopened in 2018 after refurbishment to consolidate it into a state of arrested decay. The stage machinery is one of the few surviving examples of its type in the country.

== 1875: Theatre rebuilt ==
The co-architects of the 1875 Palace were John Johnson and Alfred Meeson. They worked with an expert in stage machinery called Thomas Walford Grieve, son of Thomas Grieve, who designed sets for many London theatres during the 19th century. The stage machinery, housed 22 feet (6.7 m) below the stage, included many different mechanisms to enable scene changes, lower actors through the stage floor (traps) and to enable actors to 'fly' over the stage.

According to articles in The Era and The Hornsey journals, the theatre could hold around 3,000 people and the stage could hold hundreds. It had a floor area which was about the same as that of the London Drury Lane Theatre, but whereas the area of the Drury Lane stage is about half that of the whole theatre, that of Alexandra Palace Theatre is about a quarter, with a distance of 125 feet (38 m) between the back row of the stalls to the stage. Statues of Greek muses were installed on either side of the proscenium arch.

Most of the audience were seated in the raked floor area but there were also two balconies, neither of which reached the proscenium arch of the stage as was the case in many other London theatres of the time. It was reported that the stage could be seen from all seats. According to reports at the time the acoustics were good from every seat but others reported that the actors had to 'throw' their voices to be heard well by everyone.

The theatre was originally lit by gaslight using gaseliers suspended from the ceiling but also had natural light from glazed roofing and six large sash windows, which were blocked with dark screens during performances. The theatre was one of the first to install electric lighting in 1898, and the saltwater dimmers used to control the brightness of the lights can still be seen backstage at the theatre.

Early performances at the theatre included the operetta Breaking the Spell by Offenbach, a pantomime based on the fairy tale The Yellow Dwarf, and a ballet called Minerva. Performances of all types took place during the last 25 years of the 19th century but the Palace was closed for long periods due to lack of business with resulting financial difficulties.

== 1900: Alexandra Palace Trust ==
From 1875 to 1900 Alexandra Palace was privately owned, but In 1900 the palace and park became owned by the Alexandra Park Trust under the Alexandra Park and Palace Act (Public Purposes) Act.

== 1901: Cinema ==
At the beginning of the 20th century cinema was becoming the most popular type of entertainment, so a Cinematograph film projector was installed in the theatre in 1901. The audience was allowed to smoke in the auditorium and, as the projector was unprotected and used to project highly flammable film, there was an inevitable fire risk. Middlesex County Council ordered some work to be done to prevent fire and as a result, the theatre was closed from 1907 to 1908. One of these precautions was to build a box around the projector, which can still be seen in the theatre today. Another was to fit a 40-foot (12 m) long large iron girder weighing 6 tons above the proscenium arch of the stage to be used with a fire-proof safety curtain which divided the auditorium from the stage.

== 1914–1918: World War I ==
During WW1, the entire Palace was requisitioned as a transit camp for Belgian refugees and then as an internment camp. The theatre was used as a dormitory, chapel, cinema and a space in which internees performed concerts.

== 1922–1936 ==
The Palace was handed back to the trustees in 1922 and W. J. MacQueen-Pope was appointed general manager of the Palace. He decided to use most of the war reparation money to refurbish the theatre. The upper balcony was removed, a new staircase added to the remaining balcony, new moldings added to the ceiling to reduce echo, and a new foyer created. The work was completed in 1923 and the theatre reopened with a performance of the pantomime Cinderella. It was reported in The Era that the theatre was a 'comfortable, warm, modern playhouse capable of staging the biggest shows'. The under stage machinery that produced the effects necessary in Victorian melodrama was no longer used, but most is still preserved beneath the stage.

After the reopening, the performances in the theatre included drama, opera musical theatre, and variety. The Alexandra Palace Operatic and Dramatic Society, set up by MacQueen-Pope, with their star Nancy McMillan, performed several Gilbert and Sullivan light operas and Edwardian musical comedies.

In 1926 the theatre was leased by Archie Pitt, husband and manager of the singer Gracie Fields, who practiced and performed in the theatre.

Audiences declined during this period and the last public performance in the theatre, before it reopened in 2018, was a concert by a Royal Artillery band in 1934.

== 1935–1981: BBC and Open University ==
In 1935 the east section of Alexandra Palace, including the theatre, was leased by the BBC to produce and broadcast the first public high-definition television shows. There were plans to develop the theatre as a third television studio, but after the Second World War these plans were abandoned. The theatre was instead used as a storage and rehearsal space by the BBC. After BBC productions moved to Lime Grove Studios in 1954, BBC News moved in and when they moved out in 1969, the Open University production team took over the lease, moving out in 1981. Part of the theatre space was leased by BBC Exhibitions, a division of BBC Enterprises, for the storage of large props from Doctor Who and other productions. A flying boat from "The Pirate Planet" and the last surviving original Yeti were kept there until the mid-1980s.

== 2002: Friends of Alexandra Palace ==
The Friends of Alexandra Palace Theatre was set up in 2002 by several local supporters of the theatre, including local actors, to support the restoration of the theatre.

== 2013–2018: Restoration ==
Alexandra Palace was awarded major grants from the National Lottery Heritage Fund and Haringey Council for the East Wing Restoration Project, including the theatre, which was the biggest investment in the palace for a generation. Additional funds came from charitable trusts, businesses and individual donations. Construction in the theatre began in 2016 and included replacing the raked floor with a more versatile flat floor followed by reinstallation of the original floorboards, stabilising and sealing the plasterwork, strengthening and realigning the balcony, and installing new stairs, all while retaining the original decor as much as possible in the conservation style of arrested decay.

== 2018: Reopening ==
A BBC Prom of Gilbert and Sullivan's Trial by Jury was performed and broadcast from the theatre in September 2018 and the theatre was officially reopened to the public in December 2018, with three days of performances involving 16 schools and a range of charities and organizations. Since then the theatre has hosted many performances of pantomime, opera, concerts, stand-up comedy and drama, including community performances. It also hosted the inaugural Earthshot Prize in 2021 and is frequently used for television and film recording.

== See also ==
- List of London venues
