= Eberhard Faber Pencil Factory =

Former factory in Brooklyn, New York

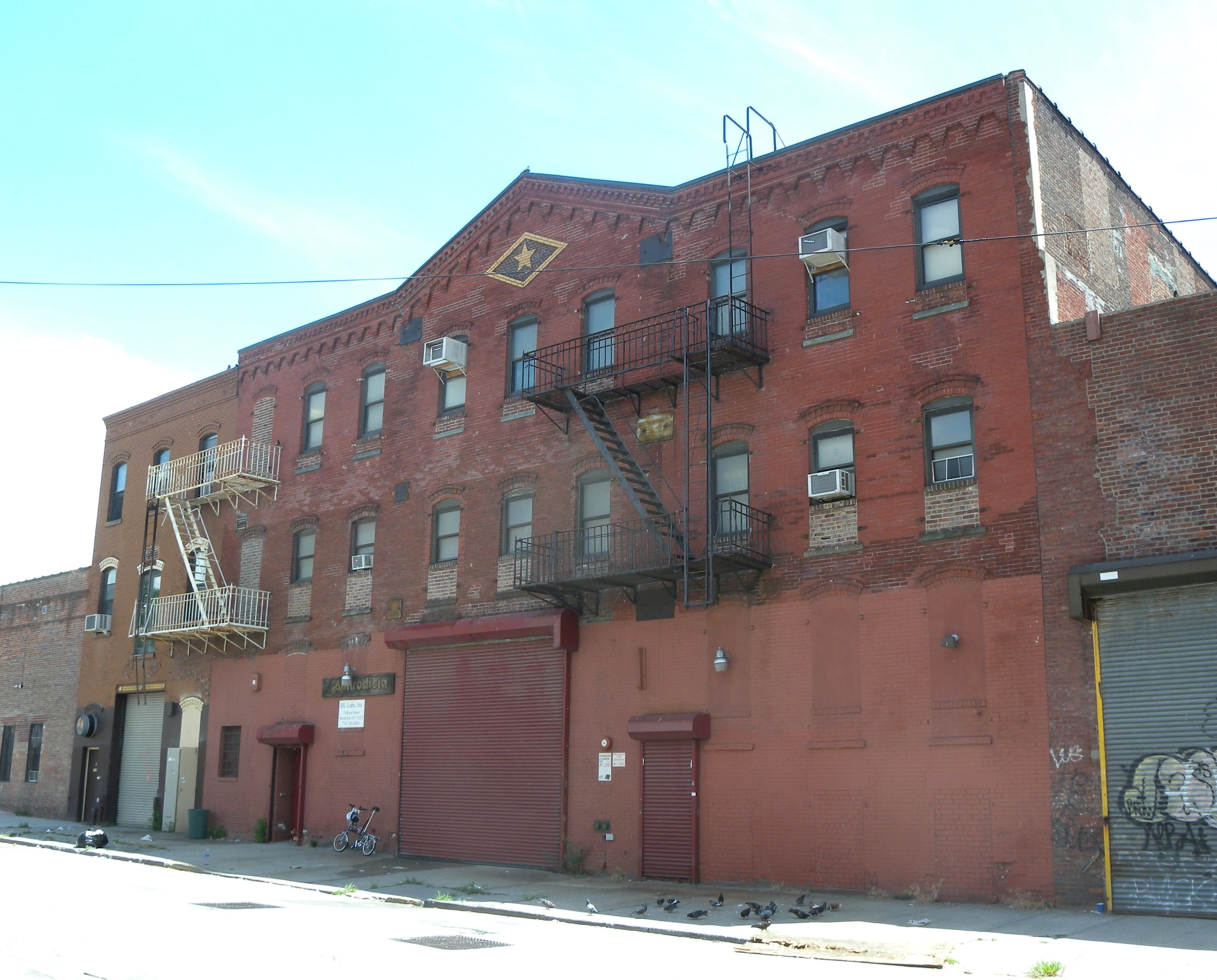
- 72–74 Kent St (right) and 76 Kent (left) as seen in July 2010
- Built: 1872; 154 years ago
- Operated: 1872–1956 (as a factory)
- Location: Greenpoint, Brooklyn, New York City
- Coordinates: 40°43′49″N 73°57′32″W
- Industry: Stationery
- Products: Pencils
- Buildings: 9
- Owner: Eberhard Faber Pencil Company (1871–1956)

New York City Landmark
- Designated: October 30, 2007
- Reference no.: 2264

The Eberhard Faber Pencil Factory (currently, Pencil Factory Recording) is a former pencil factory complex in Greenpoint, Brooklyn, New York City. Designated as a historic district by the New York City Landmarks Preservation Commission (NYCLPC) in 2007, it is composed of nine buildings spread across two blocks.

The factory was founded by John Eberhard Faber, the great-grandson of 18th-century pencil entrepreneur Kaspar Faber. The younger Faber established a pencil factory in Midtown Manhattan in 1866. Following a fire six years later, Faber moved to a larger location in Greenpoint, which expanded through the late 19th and early 20th centuries with the acquisition or addition of several buildings. Faber's children split the company from its German parent in 1898, and it remained in Greenpoint until 1956, when it moved to Pennsylvania.

By the 21st century, part of the complex was in use as the Kickstarter headquarters, while other portions of the complex had been converted to residential, commercial (the "Pencil Factory Recording" studio) and or industrial uses.

== History ==
=== Context ===
The Faber family started making lead pencils in 1761 when Kaspar Faber set up a factory in Germany. John Eberhard Faber, his great-grandson, traveled to the United States in 1849, where he bought Eastern redcedar. Two years later he opened a stationery store at 133 William Street in the Financial District of Lower Manhattan. In 1861 Faber also established a pencil factory in the eastern part of Midtown Manhattan between 41st and 43rd Streets, on the present day site of the headquarters of the United Nations. The original factory burned down in a fire on May 30, 1872, causing $250,000 in damages.

Faber moved to a larger location within three existing buildings in Greenpoint, Brooklyn, though the offices stayed in Manhattan. The new factory, which was chosen due to its proximity to ferries, was operational within three months. At the time, Greenpoint was predominantly a manufacturing district. Its largest industries were shipbuilding, porcelain and pottery, and glassworks, but the area had other industrial concerns such as brass and iron foundries; breweries; drug plants; book, furniture, box, and boiler makers; sugar refineries; and machine shops. The Eberhard Faber factory itself manufactured other items, which according to The New York Times included "eyebrow pencils, eyeliners, fountain pens, thumbtacks and pencil cases". Eberhard Faber died in 1879, soon after the company's move to Brooklyn. The company would become one of the world's largest pencil makers and would continue to operate the Brooklyn factory during this time, though it also opened factories in other locations such as Argentina, Canada, and Germany. His is sometimes erroneously credited as the first pencil factory in the United States, though David Monroe and John Thoreau had pencil factories in Concord and Ebenezer Wood in Acton, Massachusetts, decades earlier.

=== Expansion ===
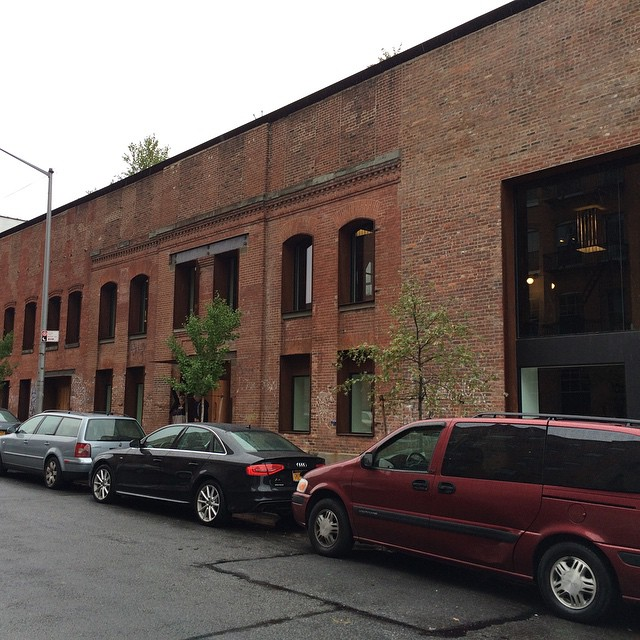
One of the buildings in the district, now used by Kickstarter

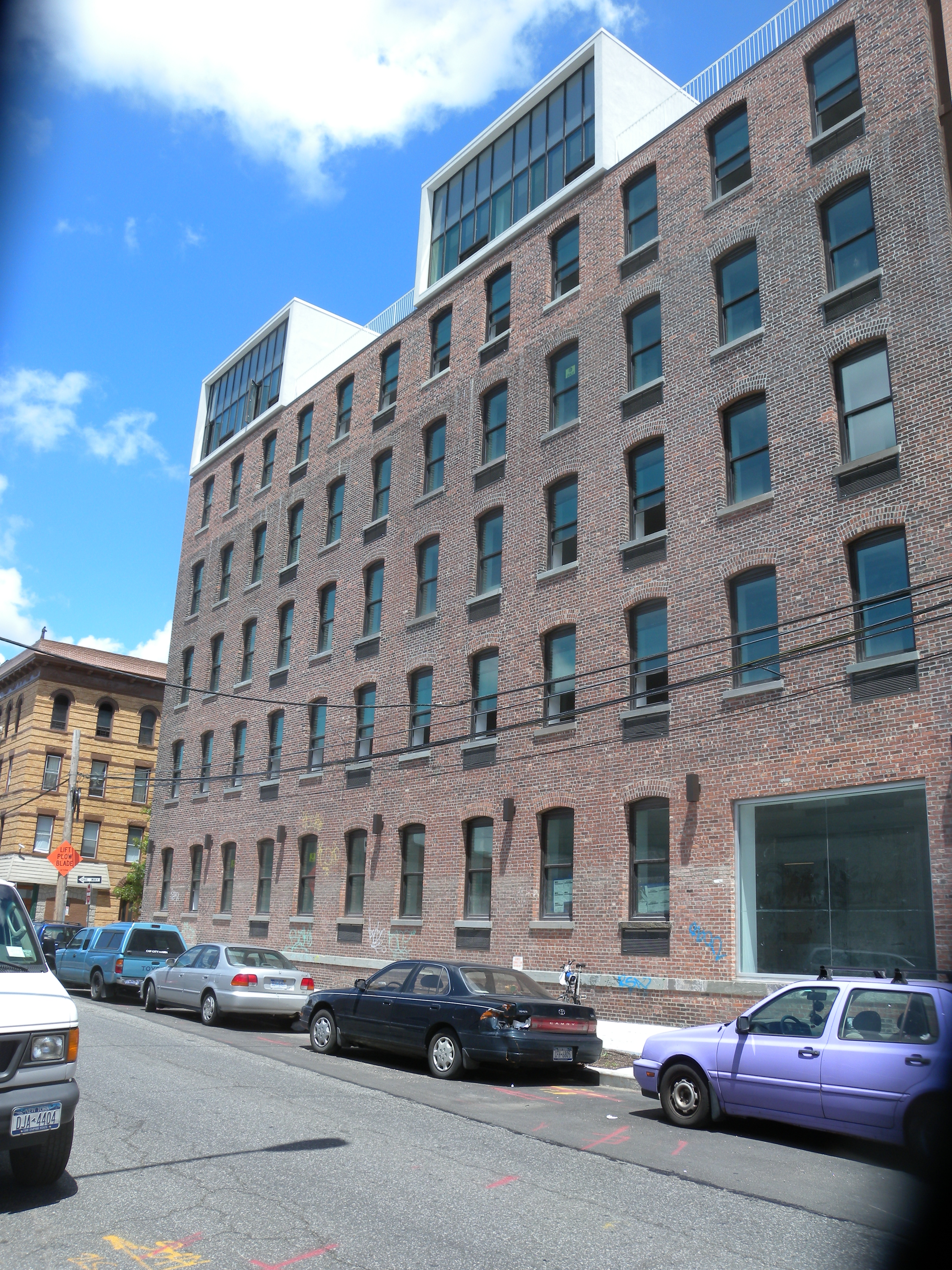
Condominiums which formerly served as factory housing

Over the next twenty years, the Eberhard Faber Pencil Factory complex was expanded with several buildings. The first such building, located at 100–106 West Street predated the factory itself, having been erected in the mid-1860s as a real estate investment for local resident and iron merchant Francis N. Gove. Another building predating the factory was 98 West Street, built by the Faience Manufacturing Company circa 1870. These structures, originally three stories, both received a fourth floor around 1901. Additional structures were built in the 1880s. The four-story 37 Greenpoint Avenue, at the corner with West Street, was built in 1881 by S.A. Valentine and taken over by Faber in the late 1880s, whereupon it was used as a mailing address and for offices. The three-story 76 Kent Street, on the south side of the street, was built at some point from 1886 to 1904 and was originally used as a stable before being taken over by Faber for storage in the early 20th century.

Eberhard Faber's children split the company from its German parent in 1898. Structures built afterward were larger and had architecture that complemented the existing buildings. The facade running along 58–70 Kent Street incorporates three former factory structures: the German Renaissance Revival structure at 60–64 Kent Street, as well as two demolished strictures, the German Renaissance Revival building at 66–70 Kent Street and the Italianate building at 58 Kent Street. This facade includes a brick cornice, cast-iron lintels, segmental windows, and courses of dentil. Three other German Renaissance Revival buildings were constructed in the complex at the turn of the 20th century. The first was the five-story 39–45 Greenpoint Avenue, built by the Valentine family in 1901. The second, a three-story structure with basement at 72–74 Kent Street, was built in 1904–1908 and possibly made specifically for the Faber factory. The third was the five-story building at 59–63 Kent Street, on the north side of Kent Street across from the main factory complex, originally connected to the main complex by a footbridge on the fourth floor. A final building at 47–61 Greenpoint Avenue was built in 1923–1924 in the Art Deco style.

The Eberhard Faber Pencil Company announced its plans to move to Wilkes-Barre, Pennsylvania, in 1955. The following year, the company moved to Pennsylvania and the factory was sold to a syndicate. By 2000, the old factory was being renovated into manufacturing and office space for several small companies. By the mid-1980s, two of the buildings in 58–70 Kent Street had been destroyed, while 76 Kent Street had been partly converted into a residential building.

The New York City Landmarks Preservation Commission designated the Eberhard Faber Pencil Factory historic district on October 30, 2007. In 2011, Kickstarter purchased several of the buildings in the complex for US$3.6 million, and announced its plans to renovated these structures, having gotten approval from the NYCLPC. The following year, 58–70 Kent Street was made into the Kickstarter headquarters. In 2018, the New York University School of Medicine signed a lease to occupy part of 72–74 Kent Street. Whalar, a talent firm, bought 58 Kent Street in December 2023 after Kickstarter transitioned to fully remote work.

== Architecture ==
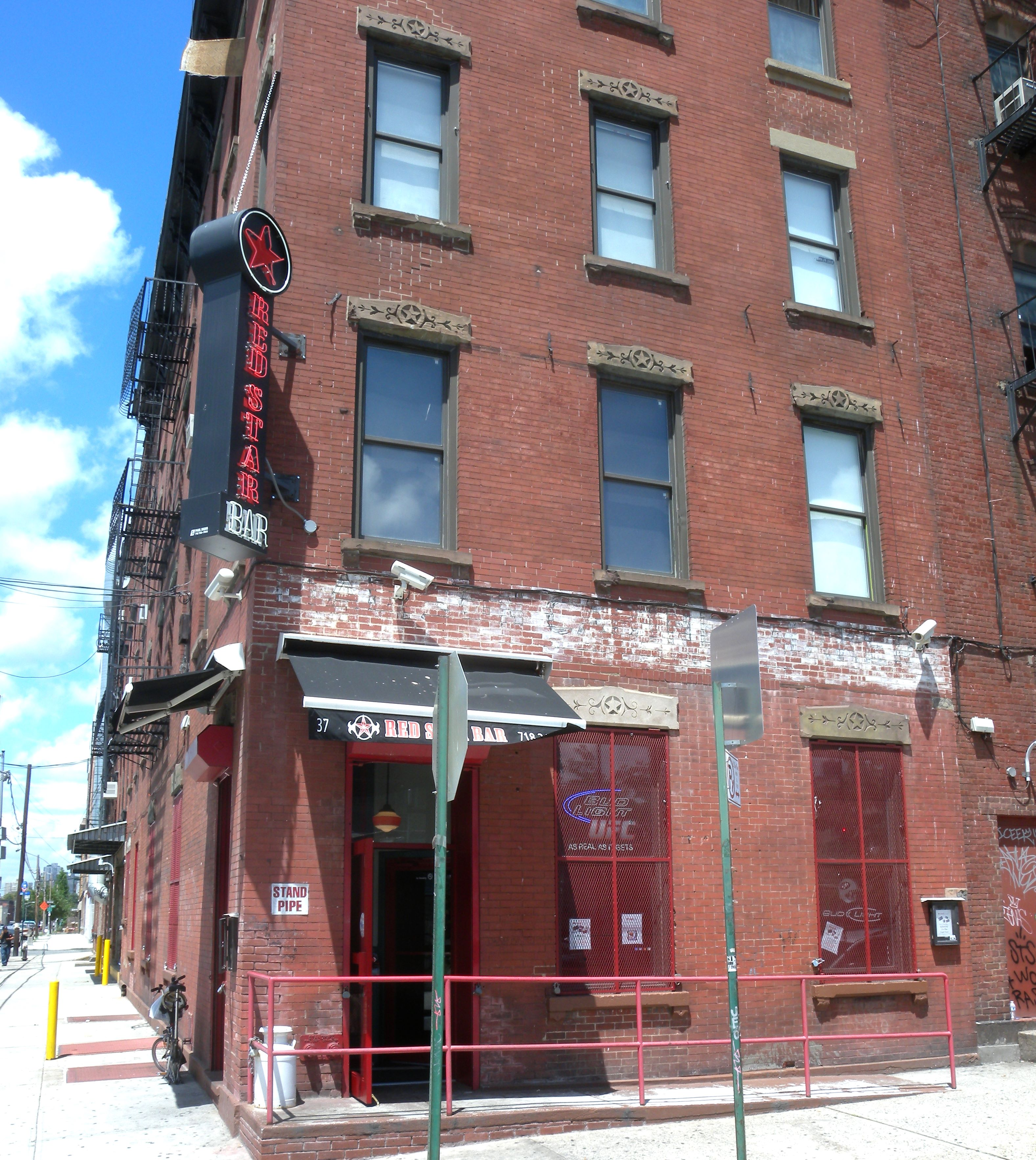
Red Star Bar at 37 Greenpoint Avenue

The Eberhard Faber Pencil Factory's constituent structures were designed in a German Renaissance Revival style or Rundbogenstil. Generally, these structures were designed based on their practical use, similar to other buildings of the era. These features included relatively narrow footprints to provide sufficient natural light to the interior, as well as flat roofs with brick parapets to reduce dust accumulation that could cause fires. However, the buildings also included numerous aesthetic elements. For instance, sections of the parapet were built with pediments to resemble gables, and many of these pediments contained the company's logo, a star-and-diamond motif. As with other factory structures built in that era, regularly spaced window openings let in natural light but also allowed an "organization" and "dignity", while decorative brick facades allowed for both a fire-resistant material and a "relatively economical means of relieving plain brickwork".

=== Greenpoint Avenue buildings ===
The buildings on Greenpoint Avenue that are within the district are on the north side of the avenue. From west to east, they are numbered 37 through 61 Greenpoint Avenue.

37 Greenpoint Avenue is located at the corner with West Street, on the western side of the block. It is a four-story brick building erected around 1881 by the Valentine family. The building was originally intended as a store with tenement apartments above, but when completed, was used for office or industrial purposes. This served as the mailing address and offices for the factory. Faber's modifications to the building included the installation of ornaments, including the company's star-and-diamond logos at the top of the building. There are three window bays on Greenpoint Avenue and eight along West Street. The West Street facade contains a historic fire escape. The building features projecting window sills and lintels, which are both made of brownstone.

39–45 Greenpoint Avenue was also developed by the Valentines and built by John M. Baker in the German Renaissance Revival style around 1901. The five-story building was made of bond brick and measures eleven window bays wide along Greenpoint Avenue. A fire escape is affixed to the western portion of the Greenpoint Avenue (southern) facade.

47–61 Greenpoint Avenue was designed by Frederick H. Klie around 1923–1924 and was purpose-built as a factory for the Faber complex. The six-story building, in the Art Deco style, contains ten window bays facing Greenpoint Avenue, as well as vertical concrete piers flanking each bay. On the facade, there are brick panels between the windows on each floor. There is terracotta ornamentation and pencil-shaped abstract ornaments on the facade.

=== Kent Street buildings ===
There are four buildings on both sides of Kent Street: three along 58–76 Kent Street on the south side, and a building at 59–63 Kent Street on the north side.

58–70 Kent Street, located on the south side of Kent Street east of the intersection with West Street, incorporates the facades of three former factory buildings on the site. The westernmost of these (on the right when facing the entrance) is 58 Kent Street, an Italianate building designed by Philemon Tillion in 1860 and erected by Francis Gove. In the center is 60–64 Kent Street, a Renaissance Revival building designed by Theobald Engelhardt and built in 1895 by Faber; this facade contains brick dentil courses and corbels, cast iron lintels, radiating brick arches, and bluestone water tables. The easternmost is 66–70 Kent Street, erected in the Romanesque Revival style, with jutting brick header arches above the windows, cast iron lintels above the doors, and iron shutter hinges. The pediments above the latter two sections show the company motif. In the 2010s, the building was renovated into the Kickstarter headquarters, but the architecture remained mostly intact.

72–74 Kent Street, a three-story brick factory in the Renaissance Revival style, was erected around 1904–1908. Measuring nine bays wide, it contains a central pediment upon which the company's motif was placed. It contains projecting greystone window sills, lintels above the windows, and a brick corbel. Two fire escapes are located on the building's facade, one shared with its eastern neighbor, 76 Kent Street. As of 2018 this space is partially occupied by the New York University School of Medicine as a physical therapy and imaging center.

76 Kent Street, a three-story Renaissance Revival building, was built at an unknown date between 1886 and 1904. It contains brick lintels, cornice and parapet, as well a first-floor steel lintel. Sometime in the 1980s it was partially made into a residential building.

59–63 Kent Street, a five-story building built around 1910–1911, is located on the north side of Kent Street. It was built to a design by F. Nelson, an obscure architect whose listed address was the same as Faber's mailing address. 59–63 Kent is nine bays wide and contains Renaissance Revival ornamentation, including brick corbels, a central pediment, and the company's motif at the top. There is one fire escape on the facade. It was formerly connected to a building across Kent Street, which is now occupied by 58–70 Kent.

=== West Street buildings ===
The complex has two buildings with addresses on the east side of West Street.

98 West Street is located in the middle of the block between Kent Street to the north and Greenpoint Avenue to the south. The four-story building contains a timber structure and a brick facade. The first two stories date from 1876, while the third story was added around 1881; both portions were in the Italianate style. The Renaissance Revival fourth story was added around 1901 by Philemon Tillion, who probably also added the fourth story of 100-106 West Street simultaneously. The first floor received renovations and became a loading dock before 1905. The second and third floors have cast-iron sills and window hoods, while the fourth floor has greystone sills and a brick lintel.

100–106 West Street, at the southeast corner with Kent Street, was the first structure in the complex to be acquired: it was built in 1860 by Francis Gove and acquired by 1872 for Faber's factory. The four-story building has a facade of bond brick, with sills and lintels made of cast iron in the Italianate style, as well as pediments with circular motifs. A Renaissance Revival parapet and gable may have been installed in the 1880s, while the fourth story was built around 1901. The building contains nine window bays on Kent Street and six on West Street.

== See also ==
- 58 Kent Street
- Eberhard Faber
