= Eberhard Faber =

American pencil company

Eberhard Faber Vertrieb GmbH
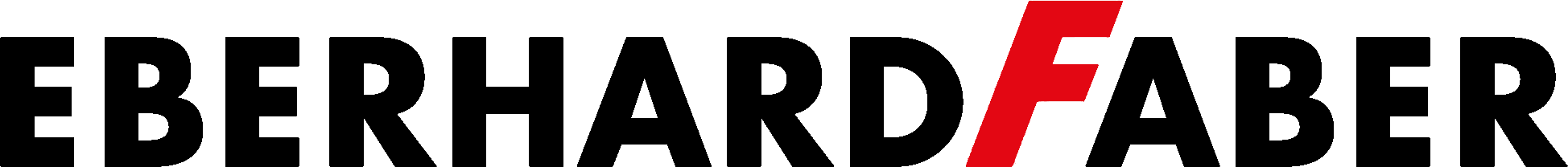

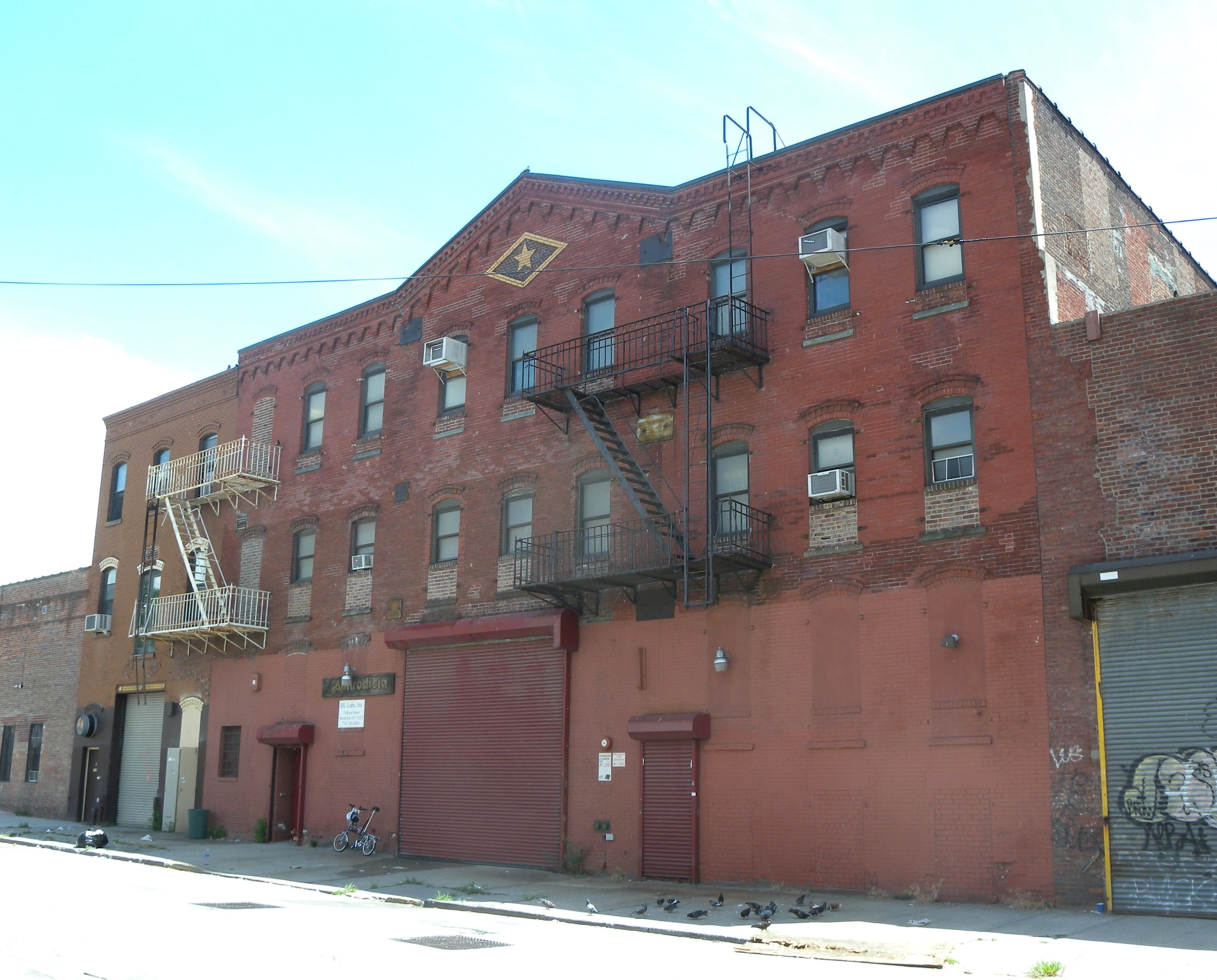
- Former pencil factory in New York City
- Formerly: Eberhard Faber Pencil Company
- Type: Private (1861–1978); Subsidiary (1978–)
- Industry: Stationery
- Founded: 1861; 165 years ago in Midtown Manhattan, United States
- Founder: John Eberhard Faber
- Headquarters: Stein, Bavaria, Germany
- Key people: Eberhard Faber; Lothar Faber
- Products: Pencils, colored pencils, pens, erasers
- Parent: Staedtler (1978–2010); Faber-Castell (1987–present) (Note: The U.S. subsidiary was acquired by Sanford L.P. in 1994. It was later added to the Paper Mate brand.)
- Website: eberhardfaber.de

Eberhard Faber Vertrieb GmbH is a manufacturer of writing implements, headquartered in Stein, Bavaria. The company was established as the "Eberhard Faber Pencil Company" by John Eberhard Faber in 1861 in Midtown Manhattan, New York City, by the East River at the foot of 42nd Street, on the present site of the United Nations Headquarters.

After an 1872 fire, operations moved to the Eberhard Faber Pencil Factory in Greenpoint, Brooklyn, across the East River. Eberhard Faber had a lumber mill on Atsena Otie Key, near Cedar Key, Florida, until it was destroyed following the 1896 Cedar Keys hurricane. In 1896, Eberhard Faber formed a partnership with the Pardo family in Caracas to expand the company into Venezuela. A German subsidiary was founded in 1922 in Neumarkt, near Nuremberg, Germany, by sons Eberhard and Lothar.

In World War I, the United States government's Office of Alien Property Custodian, including the assets of the two "Faber" descendant companies in the US, A.W.Faber-Castell and Eberhard Faber, turning them into independent American companies.

The Staedtler company, a German manufacturer of stationery with a global presence, acquired the European company, including the Eberhard Faber brand and the Neumarkt factory, in 1978, as well as the Brooklyn factory. In 1987, the Pardo family bought out the Venezuelan partnership, and continued to manufacture under the Eberhard Faber name. Staedtler sold the Brooklyn factory to Faber-Castell USA in 1988, but retains the Neumarkt factory.

In 1987, Faber-Castell USA bought the American branch of Eberhard Faber. On October 18, 1994, a complex restructuring occurred. A.W. Faber bought back the Faber-Castell USA, kept the marketing rights to the Faber-Castell name, but sold the rest of the company, including the Eberhard Faber name and factory, to Newell Brands, for $137.3 million. Newell then merged its Eberhard and Sanford divisions. Sanford also acquired the Venezuelan company from Pardo in 1997. The Eberhard line was eventually rolled it into the Paper Mate brand.

Faber-Castell of Europe reaquired the European rights to the Eberhard Faber brand in 2010.

The company manufactured the original Blackwing 602 pencil, an instrument that has achieved legendary status among writers and animators.

== See also ==
- Eberhard Faber Pencil Factory
