= Salt water dimmer =

Liquid rheostats for stage lighting control

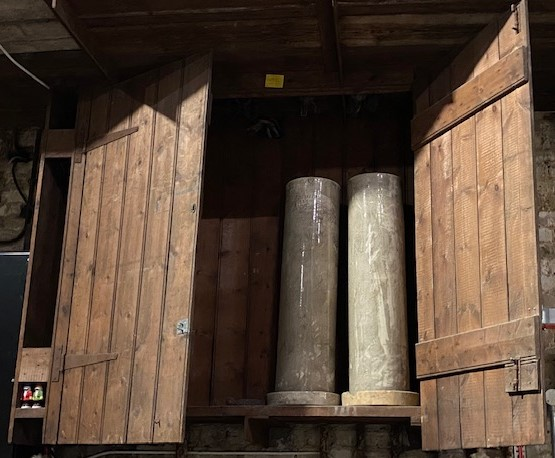
Original salt water dimmers mounted on the wall in the wings of Alexandra Palace Theatre.

Salt water dimmers, which are an early example of liquid rheostats, were used in theatres after the introduction of electric stage lighting to control the brightness of the lights on stage.

== Electric lighting ==
Electric lighting replaced gas lights in theatres from the 1880s. The first theatre to replace the gas lighting totally with electric lighting was the Savoy Theatre in 1881.

== Salt water dimmers ==
A dimmer consisted of a glass jar filled with salt water with a metal electrode at each end. As the upper electrode was moved away from the lower electrode, the resistance increased and the lights got dimmer. The brightness also depended on the concentration of salt in the water. The switchboard built at Her Majesty's Theatre, London in 1897 had a dimmer scale of 0 to 10, whereas gas lighting only had 3 levels.

The salt water needed to be refilled regularly, the metal electrodes corroded, and the dimmers emitted a strong smell. The dimmers were hazardous both because of the flammable gases produced and the potential for electric shocks.

Salt water dimmers were gradually replaced by semiconductor dimmers, the last dimmers in London theatres being replaced in 1959.

An example of a saltwater dimmer can be seen backstage at Alexandra Palace Theatre in north London.
