= John Eberhard Faber =

German-born American pencil manufacturer

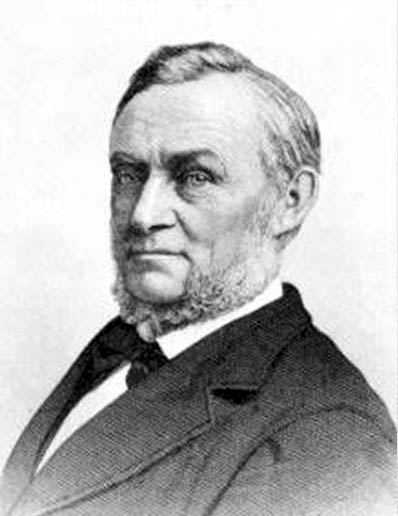
- Born: December 6, 1822; Stein Bavaria, Germany
- Died: March 2, 1879 (aged 56); New York City, U.S.
- Occupation: Pencil manufacturer
- Known for: Founder of Eberhard Faber Pencil Company
- Spouse: Jenny Haag
- Children: Bertha; Sophia; John Eberhard; Lothar W. Louise; Rosie

John Eberhard Faber (sometimes Johann Eberhard Faber; December 6, 1822 – March 2, 1879) was a German-born American manufacturer of pencils in New York. He founded the Eberhard Faber Pencil Company.

== Biography ==
Johann Eberhard Faber was born on December 6, 1822, in the village of Stein, near the city of Nuremberg, in Bavaria. His father, George Leonard Faber, was a descendant of the famous Faber family, one of ancient lineage in Bavaria engaged in the profession of manufacturing lead pencils.

He did his primary schooling at a Volksschule and then enrolled to study law at the University of Heidelberg. But he left his studies mid-way to pursue a career in commerce in America.

He moved to the United States in 1848 and opened a stationery store at 133 William Street in New York in 1849. He moved the store to 718-720 Broadway in 1877.

In 1852, he started to export red cedar logs to the Faber pencil factories in Stein, having realized that the red cedar available in America was ideal for lead pencils.

In 1861, he opened the first lead pencil factory along the East River, between 41st and 43rd streets, Midtown Manhattan. The factory was established under the name of Eberhard Faber. In 1872, a fire destroyed the factory in Manhattan, and the new Eberhard Faber Pencil Factory was built on a site on Kent and West streets in Greenpoint, Brooklyn. The new factory was designed for expansion and by the time Faber died his factory was the largest of its kind in United States and the Faber name was known all over the world.

Faber died on March 2, 1879, in New York City. Faber is interred at Green-Wood Cemetery in Brooklyn, New York.

=== Marriage and family ===
On July 1, 1854, Eberhard Faber married Jenny Haag, who was born on November 23, 1836, in Munich. She was the daughter of Ludwig and Johanna (Mangstel) Haag, members of old Bavarian families. They had six children:

1. Bertha, born April 11, 1856.
2. Sophia, born August 14, 1857.
3. John Eberhard, born March 14, 1859.
4. Lothar W., born September 27, 1861.
5. Louise, born January 2, 1866.
6. Rosie, born February 3, 1871.

The Faber family maintained a large home in Port Richmond, Staten Island in the 1870s. In 1879, after his father's death, John Eberhard Jr. took charge of the Eberhard Faber company.

== See also ==
- Eberhard Faber
