= Blackwing 602 =

Type of pencil

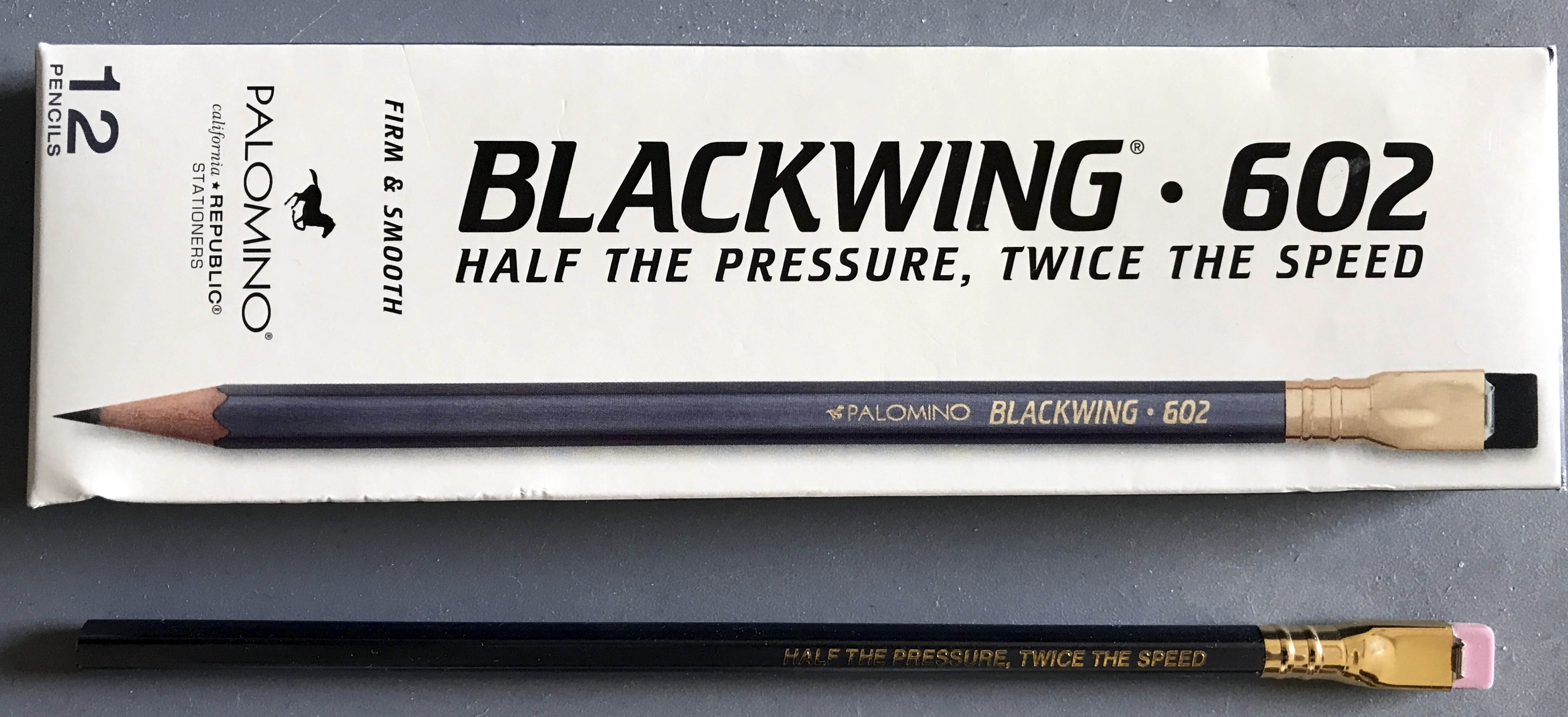
- Palomino Blackwing 602 by Cal Cedar
- Product type: Pencil
- Current owner: California Cedar (2008–present)
- Country: United States
- Introduced: 1934; 92 years ago
- Previous owners: Eberhard Faber (1934–1988); Faber-Castell (1988–1994); Sanford L.P. (1994–1998)
- Website: blackwing602.com

The Blackwing 602 is a pencil brand that has been marketed by several companies since its introduction in 1934. The pencil is noted for its soft, dark graphite, unique flat square ferrule and replaceable eraser.

The pencil initially sold for 50 cents each. After it was discontinued single original pencils were found on eBay for over $40, with some older (and rarer) ones being sold for over $100. Originals are becoming increasingly rare. As of 2012 a similar pencil using the same name is being manufactured by Palomino.

It was manufactured by the Eberhard Faber Pencil Company from 1934 to 1988, then by the Faber-Castell pencil company from 1988 to 1994 and by Sanford from 1994 to 1998. After being discontinued, the Cal Cedar Company reintroduced the product line in 2011.

== History ==
=== 1934–1998 ===
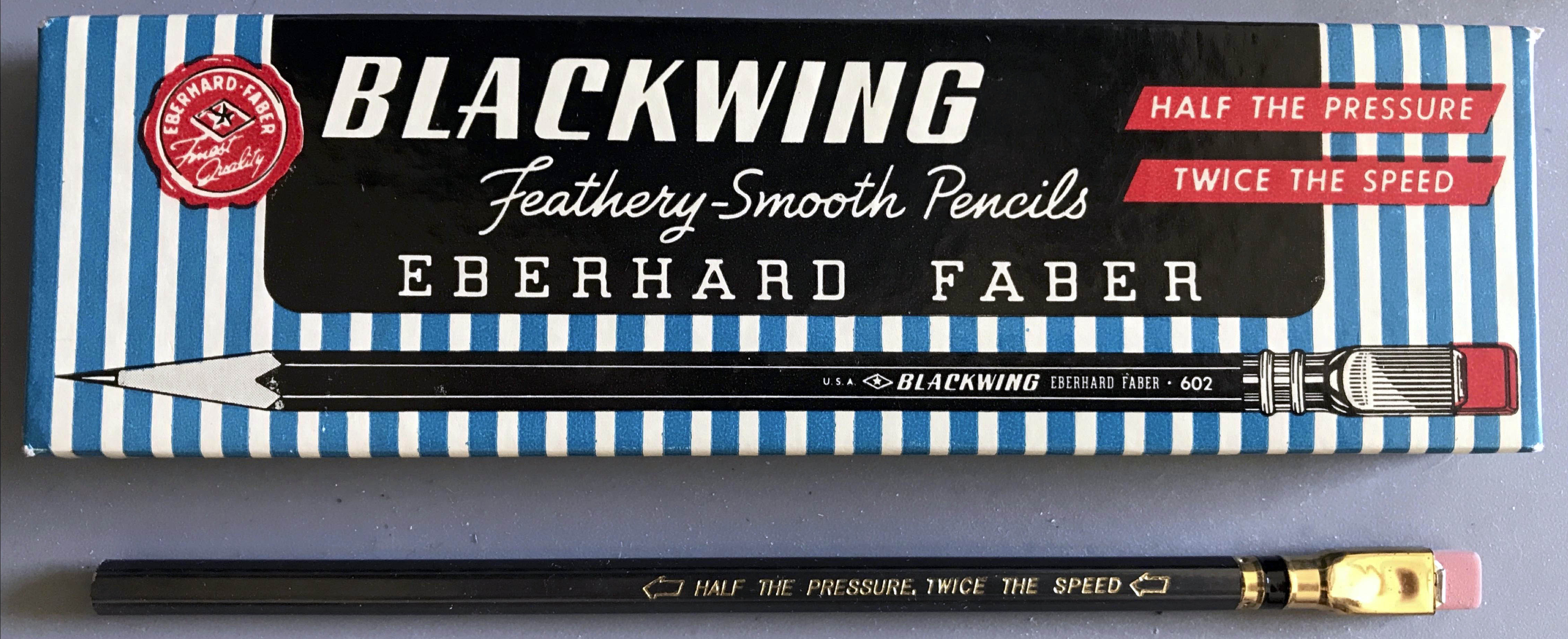
Fourth generation Blackwing 602 by Eberhard Faber, which produced it until 1988

The Eberhard Faber Pencil Company began production of the Blackwing 602 pencil in 1934. Stamped on the side, opposite the brand mark, was the slogan "Half the Pressure, Twice the Speed". This claim was meant to appeal to stenographers, as the 602 possessed the unique softness and smoothness of a 3B/4B lead but with the rate-of-wear of an HB; however the 602 quickly evolved from an office tool to that of the artist. Among these were animators Chuck Jones and Don Bluth, authors John Steinbeck, Truman Capote, and E. B. White, composers Aaron Copland, Leonard Bernstein, John Williams, Stephen Sondheim, Nelson Riddle, and Quincy Jones, playwrights Eugene O'Neill, and Arthur Laurents, the filmmaker Todd Field, and the poet Archibald MacLeish.

In 1988, Eberhard Faber was acquired by Faber-Castell, who rebranded the pencil as the Faber-Castell Blackwing 602. In 1994, the line was acquired from Faber-Castell by the Sanford division of Newell Rubbermaid, who reverted the pencil back to its Eberhard Faber Blackwing 602 branding.

During this same period, the machine used to produce the metal clip in the pencil's unique ferrule and eraser system broke. At this time, Sanford was manufacturing roughly 1,100 gross of Blackwing 602 pencils a year. Because the volume was so low, the decision was made to cease production and sell through the remaining stock. The Eberhard Faber Blackwing 602 was officially discontinued in 1998.

The final Blackwing 602 pencils included perhaps the only version bearing custom printing. As Eberhard Faber was poised to discontinue manufacturing, Lionel Spiro, a Trustee of the Boston Athenaeum, placed an order for 25 gross (i.e., 3600 pencils, or 300 boxes of 12) which he gave to the Athenaeum. A box of these pencils is held in the Harvard University Collection of Historical Scientific Instruments.

After the pencil became unavailable, individual Blackwing 602 pencils have regularly commanded $40 or more on auction sites like eBay.

=== 2008–present ===
In 2008, California Cedar Products Company acquired the Blackwing name and introduced a new version of the Blackwing 602 pencil under its Palomino division in June 2011. It was launched exclusively on Pencils.com, but has since launched its own website and blog, and is distributed to retailers around the world.

A portion of all Blackwing pencils sold benefits the Blackwing Foundation, which was established to support music and art education in schools.
