= Blackwing Sweden Blackwing =

Swedish airplane

Blackwing
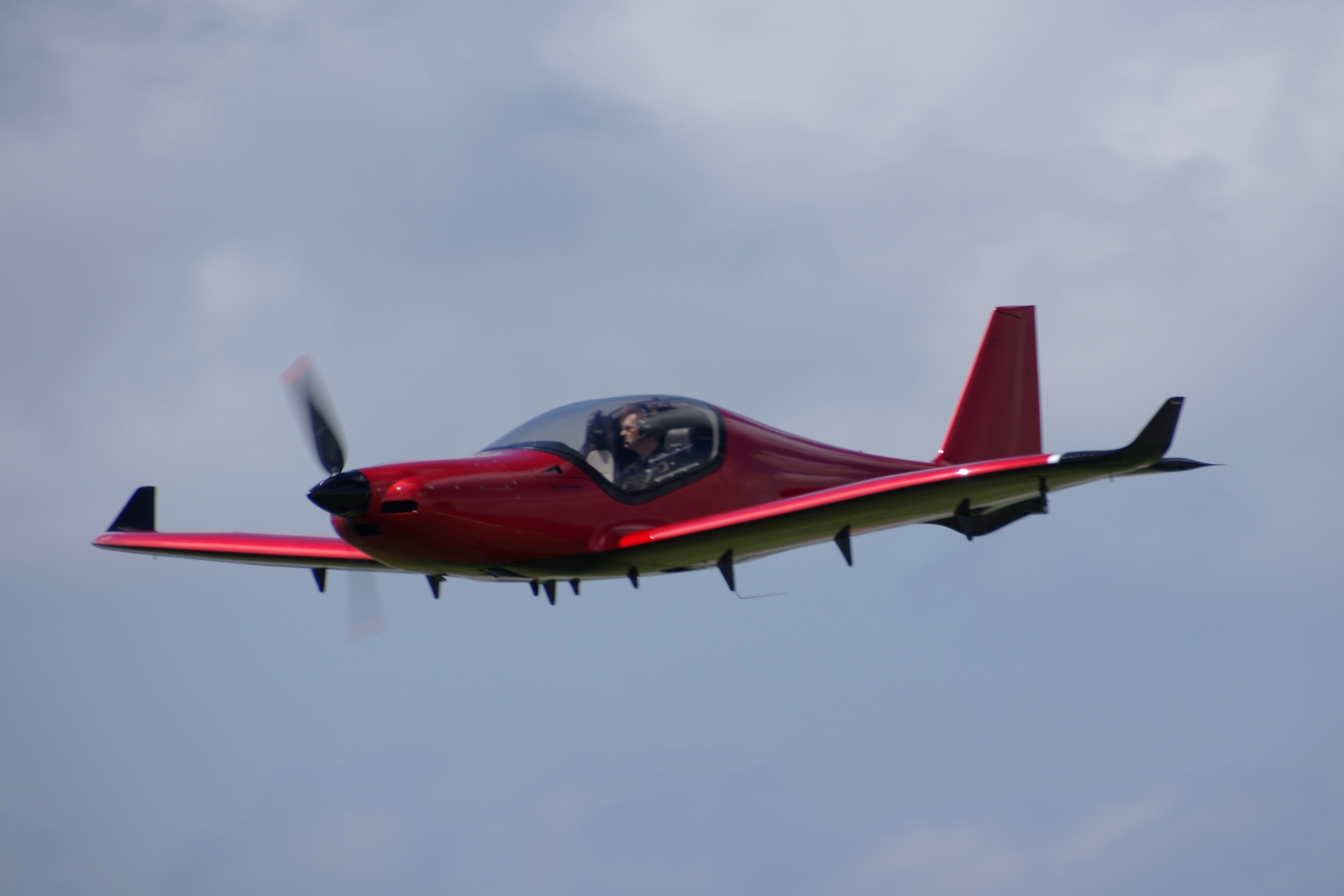
- Blackwing 600 RG

General information
- Type: Ultralight aircraft and Light-sport aircraft
- National origin: Sweden
- Manufacturer: Blackwing Sweden AB
- Status: In production
- Primary user: private pilots
- Number built: 43

History
- Introduction date: 2015

The Blackwing Sweden Blackwing is a series of airplanes made by Blackwing Sweden, an aviation company that specializes in crafting high-performance ultralight aircraft that blend cutting-edge technology with sleek design.

== Design and development ==
The Blackwing is the result of a research project commenced in the 1990s, culminating in wind tunnel tests and a 350-hour prototype flight test program. It was designed to comply with the Fédération Aéronautique Internationale microlight rules with a version at a gross weight of 472.5 kg (1,042 lb) and US light-sport aircraft rules with a version with a gross weight of 600 kg (1,323 lb).

The design features a cantilever low-wing, an enclosed cockpit with two seats in a side-by-side configuration under a bubble canopy, fixed or optionally retractable tricycle landing gear, and a single engine in tractor configuration.

The aircraft is made from pre-preg carbon fibre built on a foam core, under a certified production system in Landskrona, Sweden. Its 8.4-metre-span (28 ft) wing has an area of 9.4 m^{2} (101 sq ft) and flaps.

Avionics: Garmin G3X with Vertical Power integration, digital circuit protection, and automatic backup battery. Models and engines: – BW635RG (Rotax 915 iS, 141 hp) – BW650RG (Rotax 916 iS, 160 hp) Performance: up to 370 km/h top speed, 12.7 m/s climb, 175–290 m takeoff distance.

The cabin width for all models is 121 cm (48 in), ergonomic seats with memory foam, 4-point harness, optional heating.

As of January 2017, the design does not appear on the US Federal Aviation Administration's list of approved special light-sport aircraft.

== Operational history ==
Reviewer Marino Boric described the design in a 2015 review as "a sleek speedster". FAI World Speed Record 2023–2024 (600 kg class RAL2T) set by CEO Niklas Anderberg.

== Variants ==
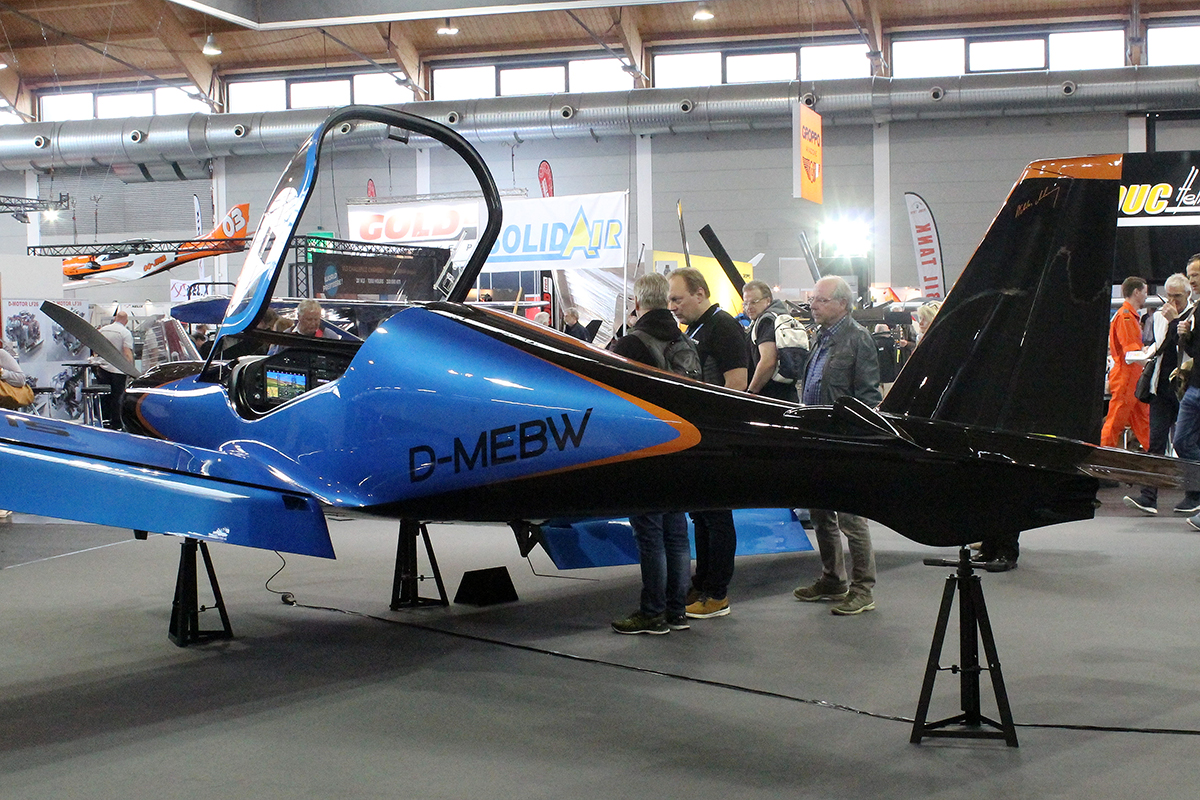
Blackwing BW635RG

Blackwing 650RG
Model with 600 kg (1,323 lb) gross weight for the European microlight category, retractable landing gear and a cruise speed of 352 km/h (219 mph) at FL 100.

The Blackwing 650RG is an advanced ultralight aircraft with the following features:

- Airframe: Constructed from prepreg carbon fiber, offering a lightweight and strong structure.
- Seating: Side-by-side configuration with a 1.21-metre-wide cabin.
- Performance: High-end tandem performance, capable of cruise speeds up to 352 km/h.
- Safety: Certified for 600 kg with a spin recovery tailplane design, offering enhanced safety.
- Engine: Options from 141HP to 160HP, depending on local microlight regulations.
- Avionics: Equipped with Garmin G3X Touch as the Primary Flight Display, Garmin autopilot, and other high-standard interior features.
- Propeller: Constant speed with single-lever control for better performance across flight regimes.
- Braking: Behringer brakes for superior stopping power.
- Market: Available in Europe with a listed new price around €370,000 + VAT for a fully equipped model, with wait times of 6–8 months.

The Blackwing 600RG was first flown in 2017 and has now developed into the Blackwing 650RG. It has been showcased at events like AERO Friedrichshafen, highlighting its modern design and capabilities.

== Specifications (Blackwing 650RG) ==
Data from manufacturer and Tacke

General characteristics

- Crew: one
- Capacity: one passenger
- Wingspan: 8.4 m (27 ft 7 in)
- Wing area: 9.4 m^{2} (101 sq ft)
- Empty weight: 375 kg (827 lb) including Ballistic Recovery Systems ballistic parachute
- Gross weight: 600 kg (1,323 lb)
- Fuel capacity: 140 Litres
- Powerplant: 1 × Rotax 915iS or 916iS four cylinder, liquid and air-cooled, four stroke aircraft engine, 105 or 119 kW (141 or 160 hp)
- Propellers: 3-bladed E-Props

Performance

- Maximum speed: 370 km/h (230 mph, 200 kn) TAS at FL100
- Cruise speed: 278 km/h (173 mph, 190 kn) 65% at FL100
- Stall speed: 65–70 km/h (40–44 mph, 35–38 kn)
- Never exceed speed: 320 km/h (199 mph, 173 kn) TAS at Sea Level
- Range: 1,900 km (1,200 mi, 1,040 nmi) 5.5 h at 65%
- g limits: +4.4, -2.2
- Rate of climb: 12.7 m/s (2,500 ft/min)
- Wing loading: 50.3 kg/m^{2} (10.3 lb/sq ft)
