= Arrested decay =

Historic preservation without renovation

Arrested decay is the limited preservation of abandoned or ruined buildings. It was coined by the U.S. State of California to explain its approach to the preservation of the ghost town of Bodie. The concept is most frequently invoked in relation to the preservation of war ruins as memorials.

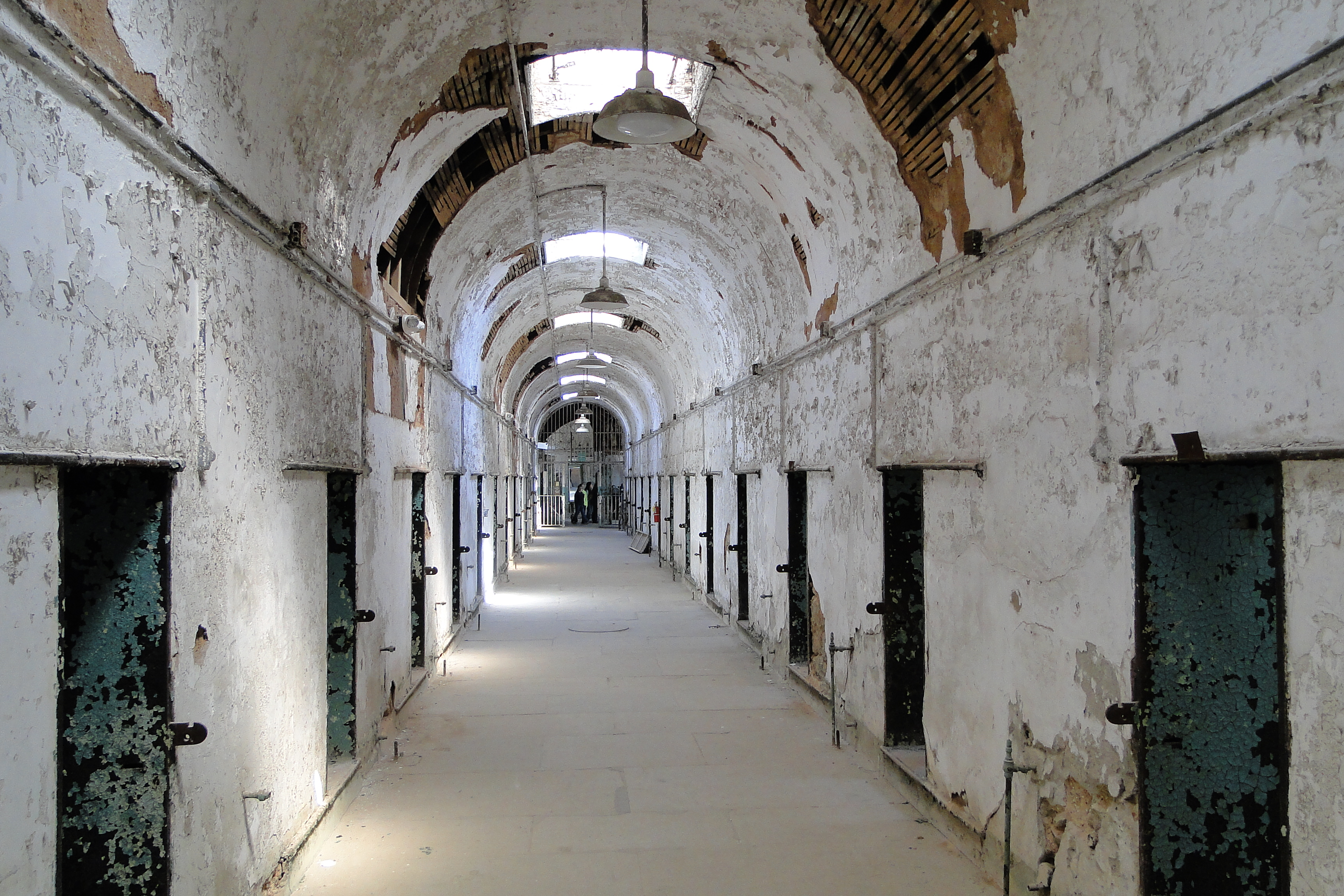
Eastern State Penitentiary, March 2011

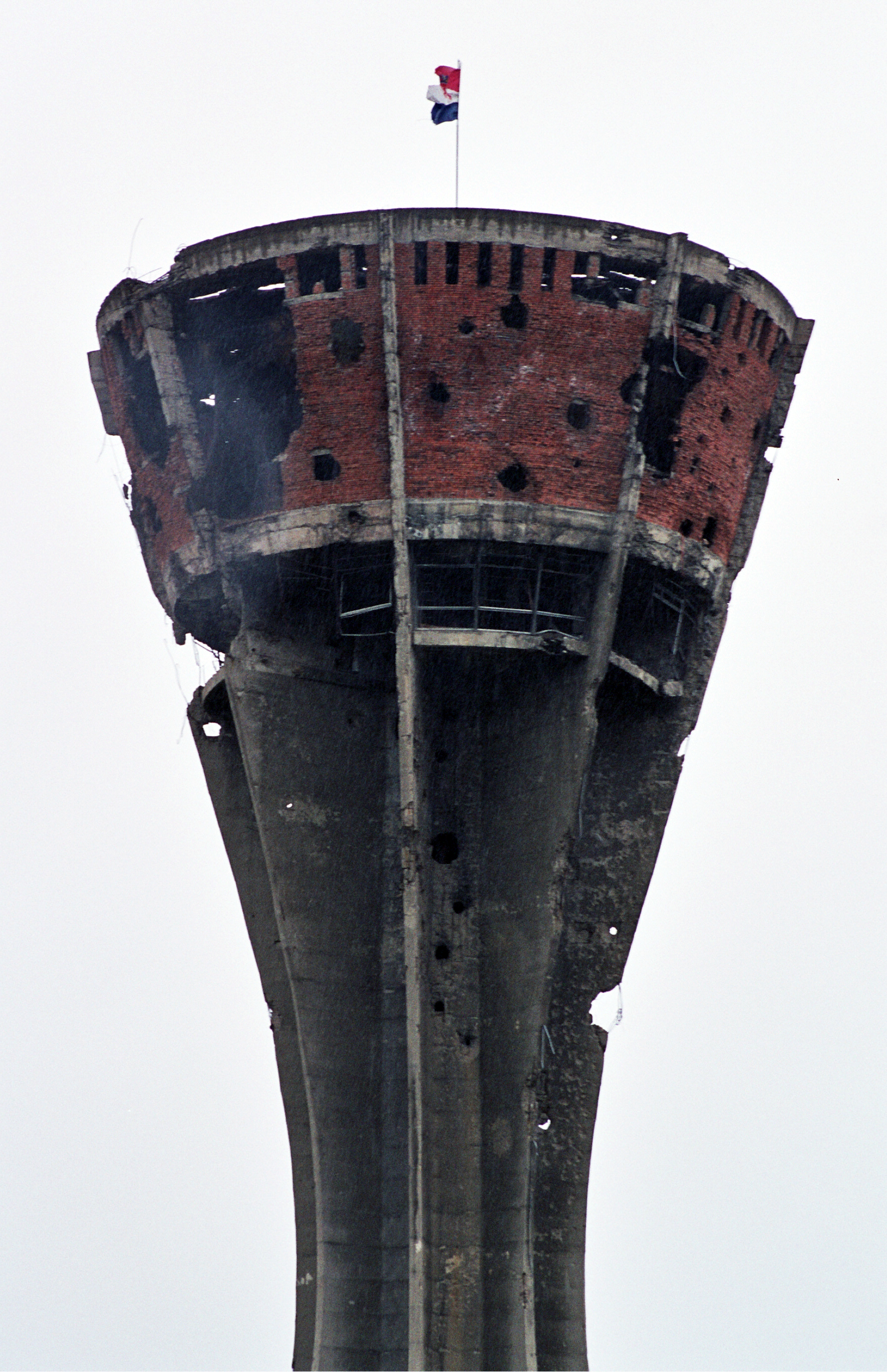
The water tower in Vukovar, 2005. Heavily damaged during the Battle of Vukovar, it has been preserved as a symbol of the town's suffering.

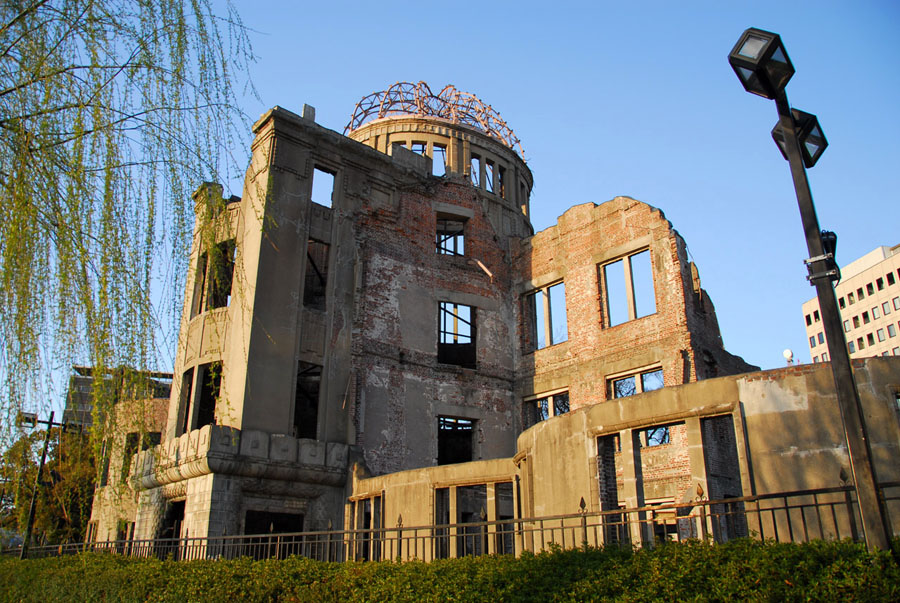
The Hiroshima Peace Memorial today, seen from the southwest side.

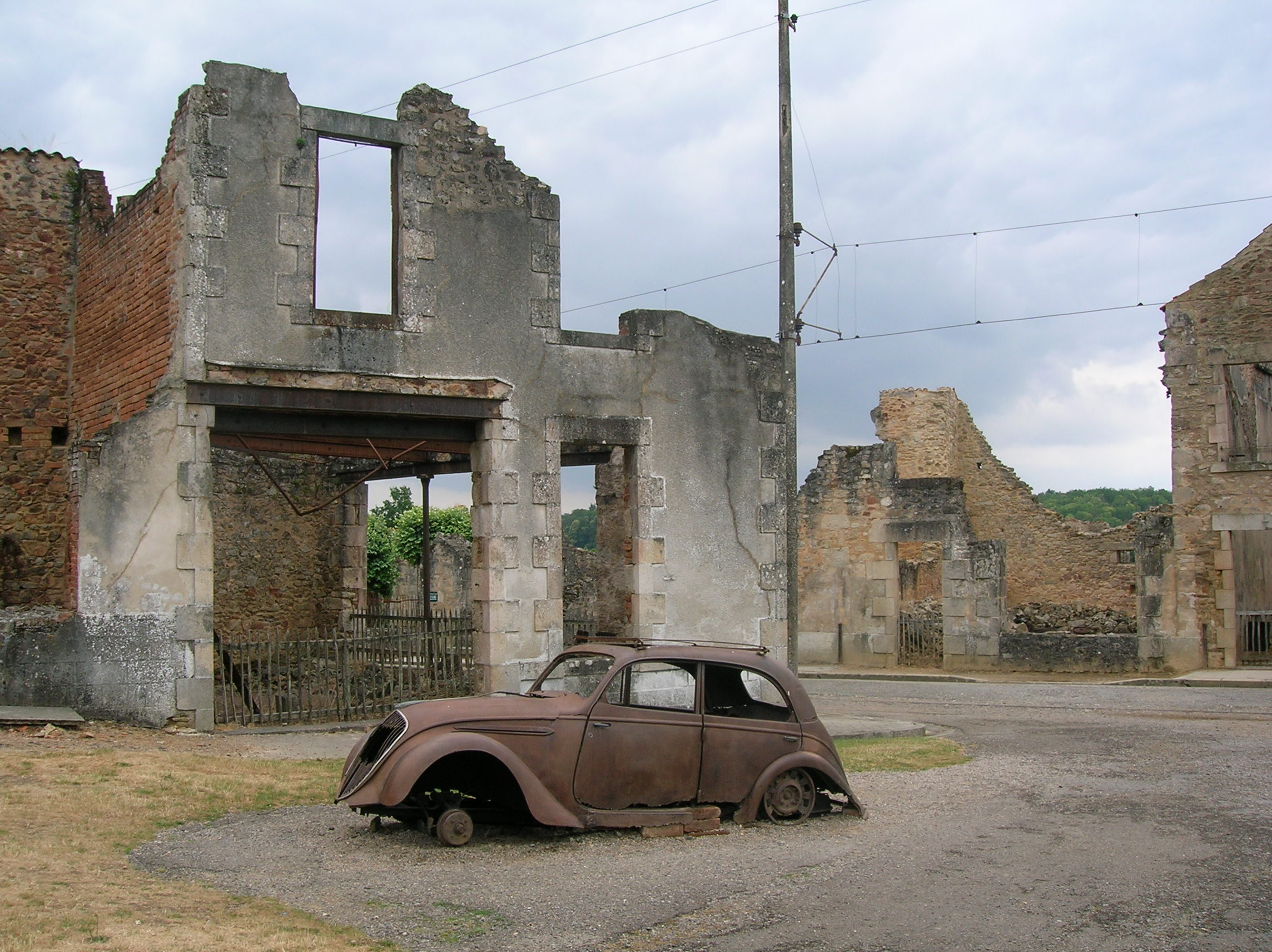
A view of the old village of Oradour-sur-Glane

== United States ==
At Bodie State Historic Park in California, the structures will be maintained, but only to the extent that they will not be allowed to fall over or otherwise deteriorate in a major way. Any building that was standing in 1962, when Bodie became a State Park, may be rebuilt or preserved as the photographs of 1962 showed them. By putting new roofs on the buildings, rebuilding foundations, and resealing glass that is in window frames, the State is able to keep buildings from naturally decaying.

Eastern State Penitentiary in Philadelphia, Pennsylvania, uses a similar system, though it uses the term "preserved ruin."

== Croatia ==
The authorities in Vukovar, Croatia decided to keep the old water tower in the city as it is found today and as it had become after the war — damaged by artillery.

== Berlin, Germany ==
Several buildings destroyed in the Second World War have been preserved in their ruined condition as memorials. These include part of the facade of the Anhalter Bahnhof and the belfry of the Kaiser Wilhelm Memorial Church.

== Sarajevo, Bosnia ==
The authorities in Sarajevo, Bosnia have also preserved the building of the daily newspaper Oslobođenje to this day the way it was shelled during the Bosnian War.

== Hiroshima, Japan ==
In 1996, the Hiroshima Peace Memorial was acknowledged as a UNESCO World Heritage Site. Originally completed in 1905, the building was known at the time of the Hiroshima atomic bomb explosion on August 6, 1945, as the Hiroshima Prefectural Industrial Promotion Hall. Although suffering considerable damage, it was the closest structure to the hypocenter of the explosion to withstand the blast without being leveled to the ground. It has been preserved in the condition it was in after the bombing to serve as a symbol of hope for world peace and nuclear disarmament.

== Oradour-sur-Glane, France ==
Oradour-sur-Glane was a village in the Limousin région of France that was destroyed on 10 June 1944, when 642 of its inhabitants – men, women and children – were murdered by a German Waffen-SS company. Although a new village was built after World War II, away from the ruins of the former village, the old village – the site of the massacre – still stands as a memorial to the dead and represents similar sites and events. Part of the memorial includes items recovered from the burned-out buildings: watches stopped at the time their owners were burned alive; glasses melted from the intense heat; and various personal items and money.

== Macau ==
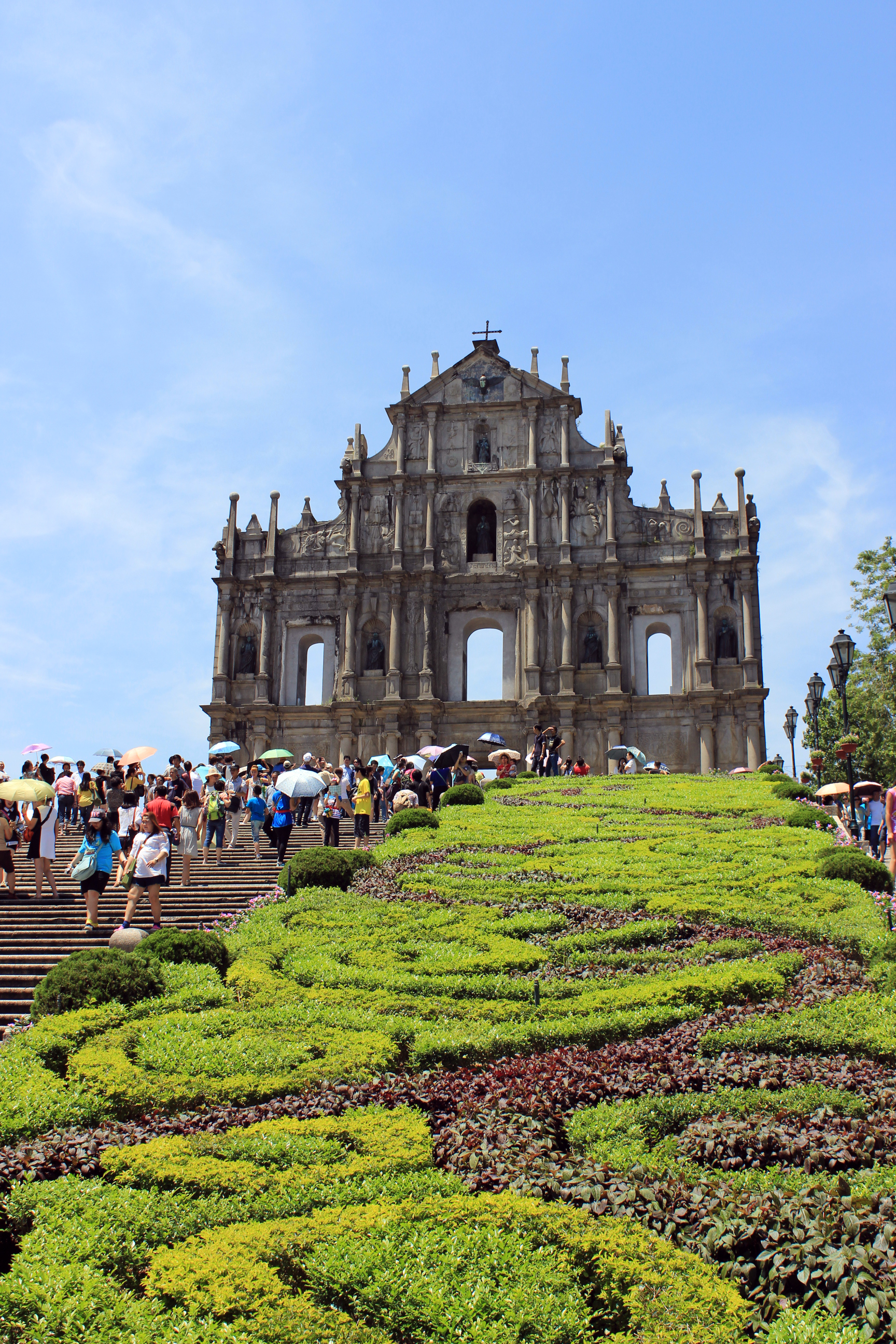
The Ruins of Saint Paul's in Macau

The Ruins of Saint Paul's is a UNESCO World Heritage Site and is considered to be an example of arrested decay. The original 17th-century church was destroyed by a fire during a typhoon on 26 January 1835, leaving just the façade. Resisting calls for the dangerously leaning structure to be demolished, from 1990 to 1995, the ruins were excavated under the auspices of the Instituto Cultural de Macau to study its historic past. The ruins were restored by the Macanese government into a museum, and the façade is now buttressed with concrete and steel in a way which preserves the aesthetic integrity of the façade. It is now one of Macau's best-known landmarks.
