= Kring =

Kring can refer to:

== Places ==
- Mount Kring, a nunatak in Oates Land, Antarctica
- Kring Islands, Kemp Land, Antarctica

== People ==
- Arne Kring (born 1942), Swedish motocross racer of the 1960s and 1970s
- Hilding Kring (1899–1971), Swedish Army lieutenant general
- James B. Kring (1921–1990), American entomologist
- Tim Kring (born 1957), American screenwriter and television producer

== Groups ==
- De Kring, Artists Society founded at Amsterdam in 1922
- Kommunisten Kring Breda (marxistisch-leninistisch), a communist group formed in 1972 in Breda, Netherlands
- Koninklijke Oost- en Westvlaamsche Kring, als known as Via-Via, a bilingual (French and Flemish) and nonpolitical student fraternity from Leuven (Belgium) founded in 1922
- Republikeinse Kring, a Belgian cultural trilingual republican association

== Other uses ==
- 8391 Kring, an asteroid
- Kring... Kring..., a 2015 Tamil thriller movie directed by Rahul
- Kring Carpenter Shop, also known as Coffin Shop, a historic commercial building in Gainesville, Sumter County, Alabama
- Kring Point State Park, a 61-acre state park located on the St. Lawrence River in the Town of Alexandria, Jefferson County, New York
- Volvo Kring Føroyar, a road cycling race held in the Faroe Islands

== See also ==
- Krings (surname)
- Cristina Gonzales (born 1976), actress turned politician, nicknamed "Kring-Kring"
