= List of art techniques =

There is no exact definition of what constitutes art. Artists have explored many styles and have used many different techniques to create art.

== A ==
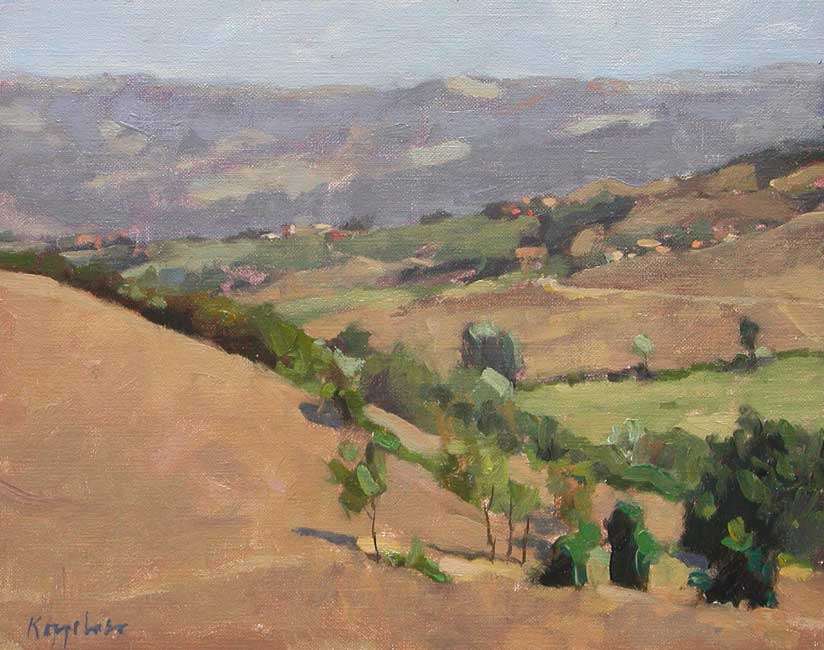
Aerial perspective by Frans Koppelaar, Landscape near Bologna, 2001; distant objects are lighter, of lower contrast, and bluer than nearer objects.

- Airbrushing technique
- Aerial perspective technique
- Acrylic painting techniques
- Aging (artwork) technique
- Aquatint
- Assemblage (art) technique
- Animation (digital art)

== B ==
- Basse-taille enameling technique
- Burnishing
- Freehand brush work

== C ==
a Collage by Pablo Picasso cut and pasted colored paper, gouache and charcoal on paperboard

- Camaïeu technique
- Cast paper
- Ceramic forming techniques
- Cerography
- Champlevé
- Chiaroscuro technique
- Cloisonné
- Collage
- Contour drawing technique
- Contour rivalry
- Crosshatching

== D ==
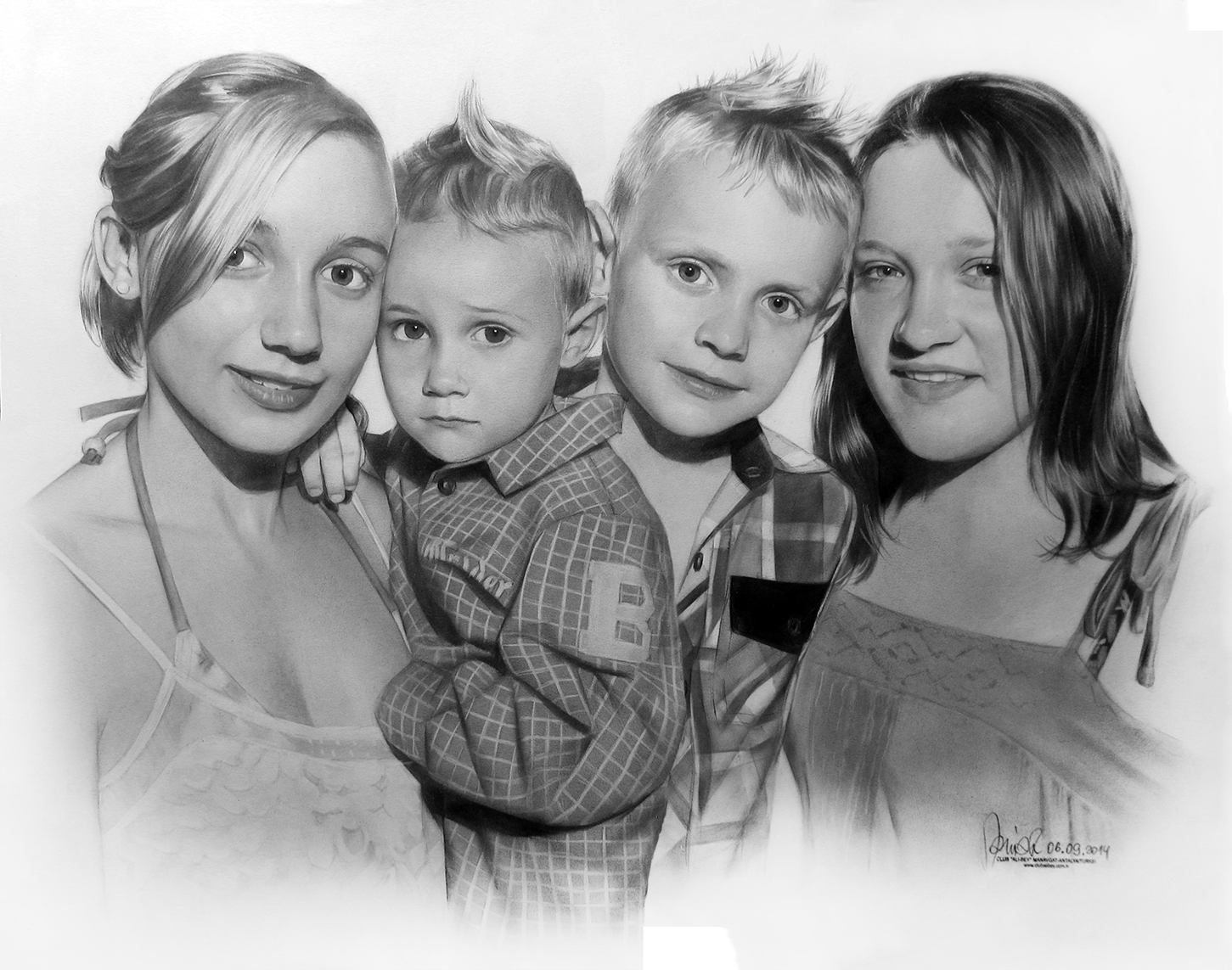
Portrait using dry brushing technique

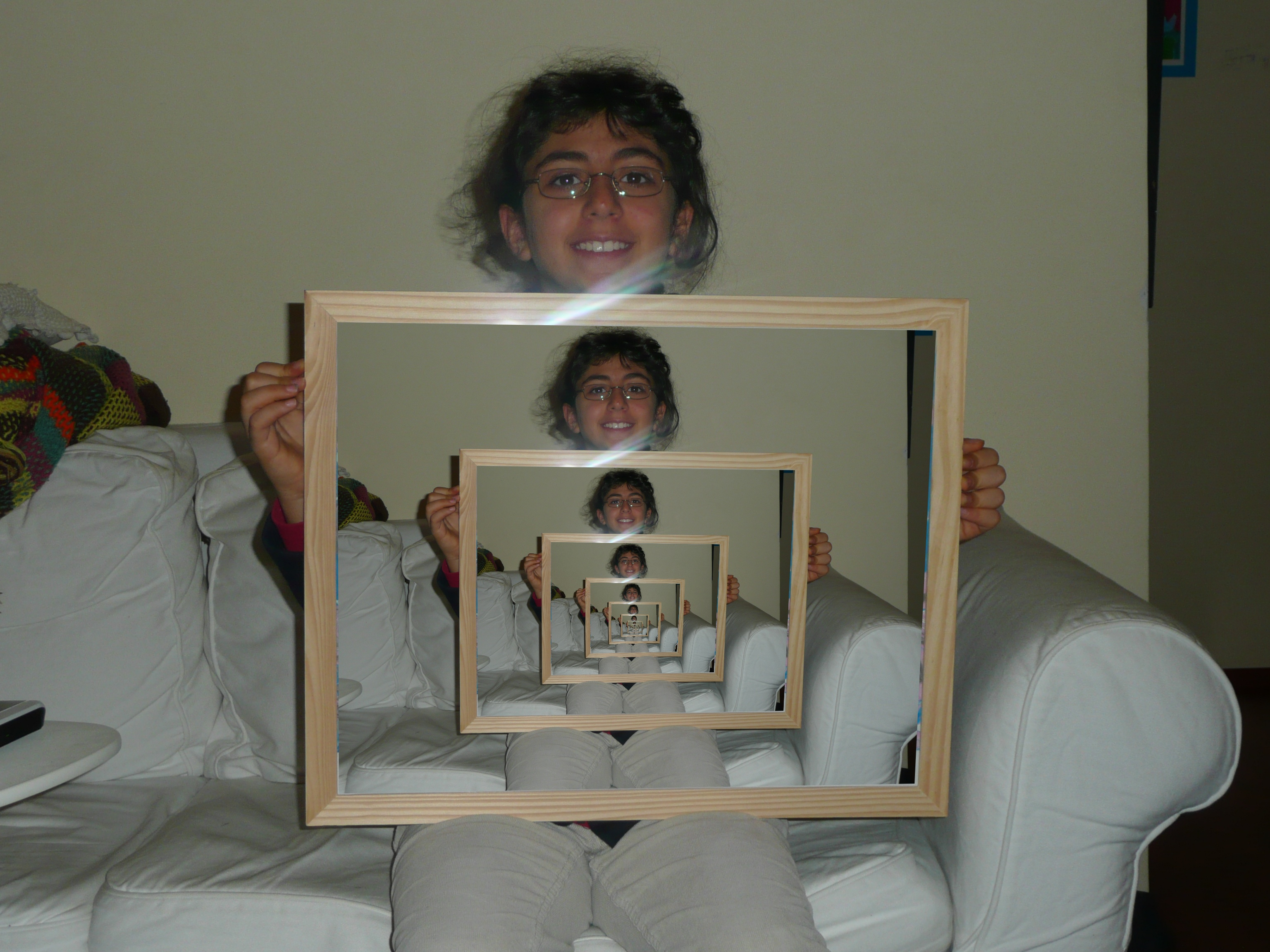
The Droste effect

- Dalle de verre
- Décollage technique
- Digital painting technique
- Distressing technique
- Divisionism technique
- Drip painting
- Droste effect
- Drybrush
- Dye-sublimation technique

== E ==
- Embossing technique
- Encaustic (hot wax) painting technique
- En résille enameling technique
- Etching technique

== F ==
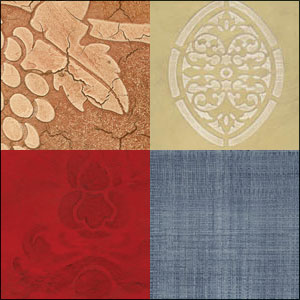
Examples of faux paintings.

- Fat over lean
- Faux painting
- Fingerpaint
- Fresco
- Froissage
- Fresco-secco

== G ==
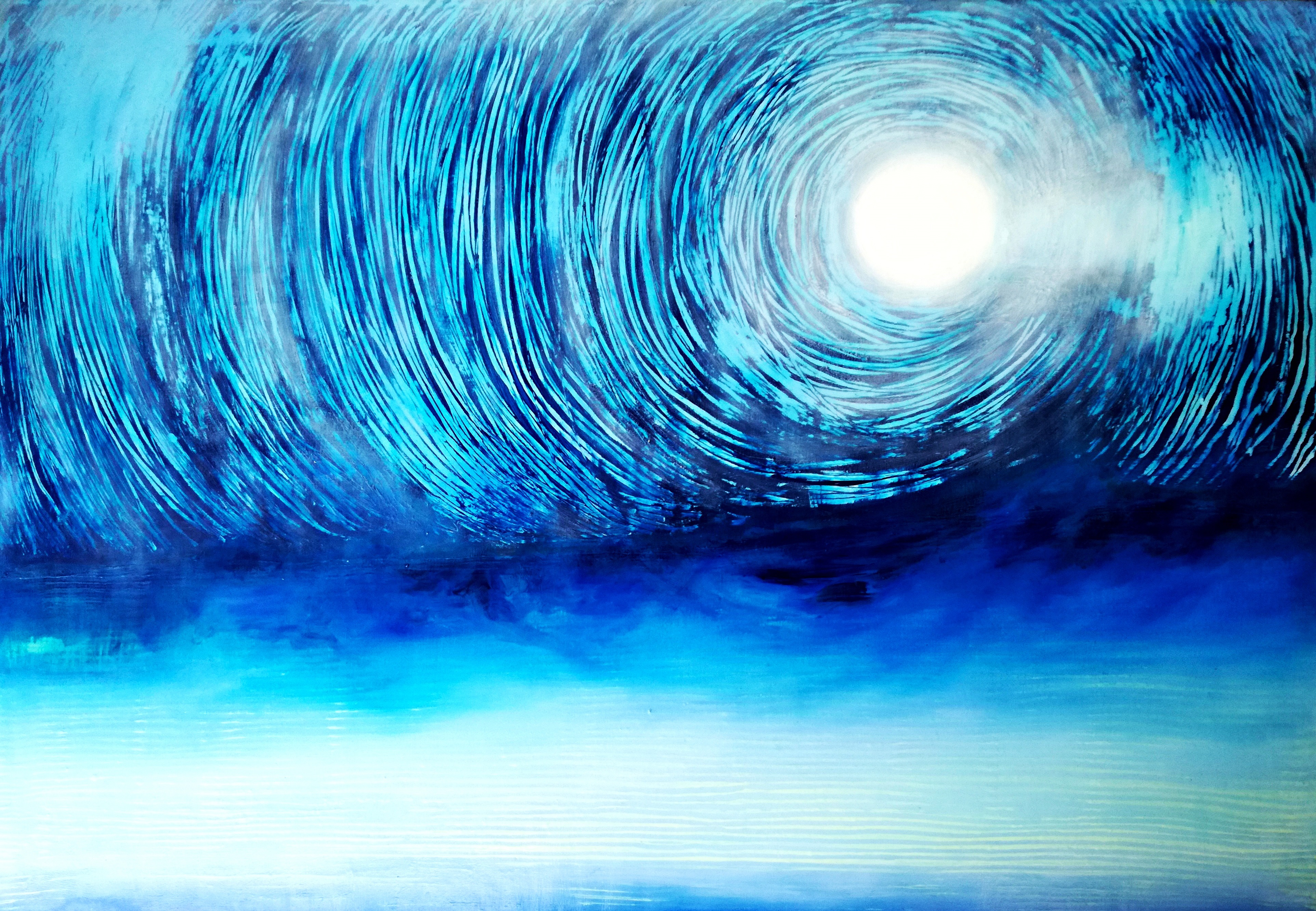
Example of grattage

- Gilding technique
- Glassblowing
- Glaze (painting technique)
- Gongbi
- Gradation
- Grattage
- Grisaille

== H ==
- Haboku
- Hierarchical proportion

== I ==
Van Gogh - The Starry Night by Vincent Van Gogh - an example of impasto technique and line structure.

- Illusionistic ceiling painting
- Impasto
- Intaglio (printmaking) technique
- Ink wash painting technique

== K ==
- Keum-boo gilding technique

== L ==
- Linocut technique
- Lithography
- Lost-wax casting

== M ==
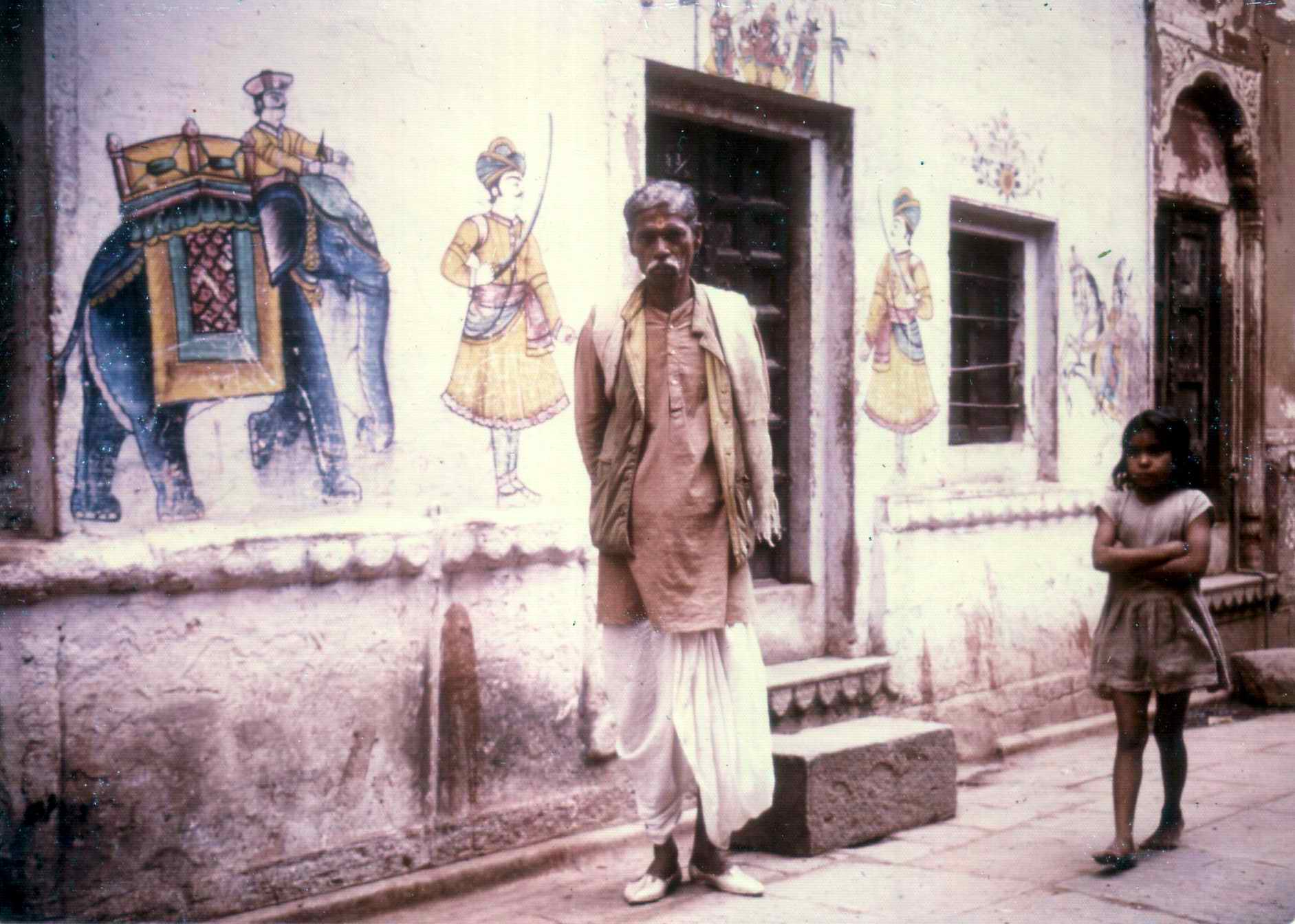
Wall paintings, (mural) Varanasi, India, 1974.

- Metalcut technique
- Mosaic art technique
- Multidimensional art
- Mural Painting technique

== N ==
- Nerikomi artistic technique

== O ==
- Oblique projection

== P ==
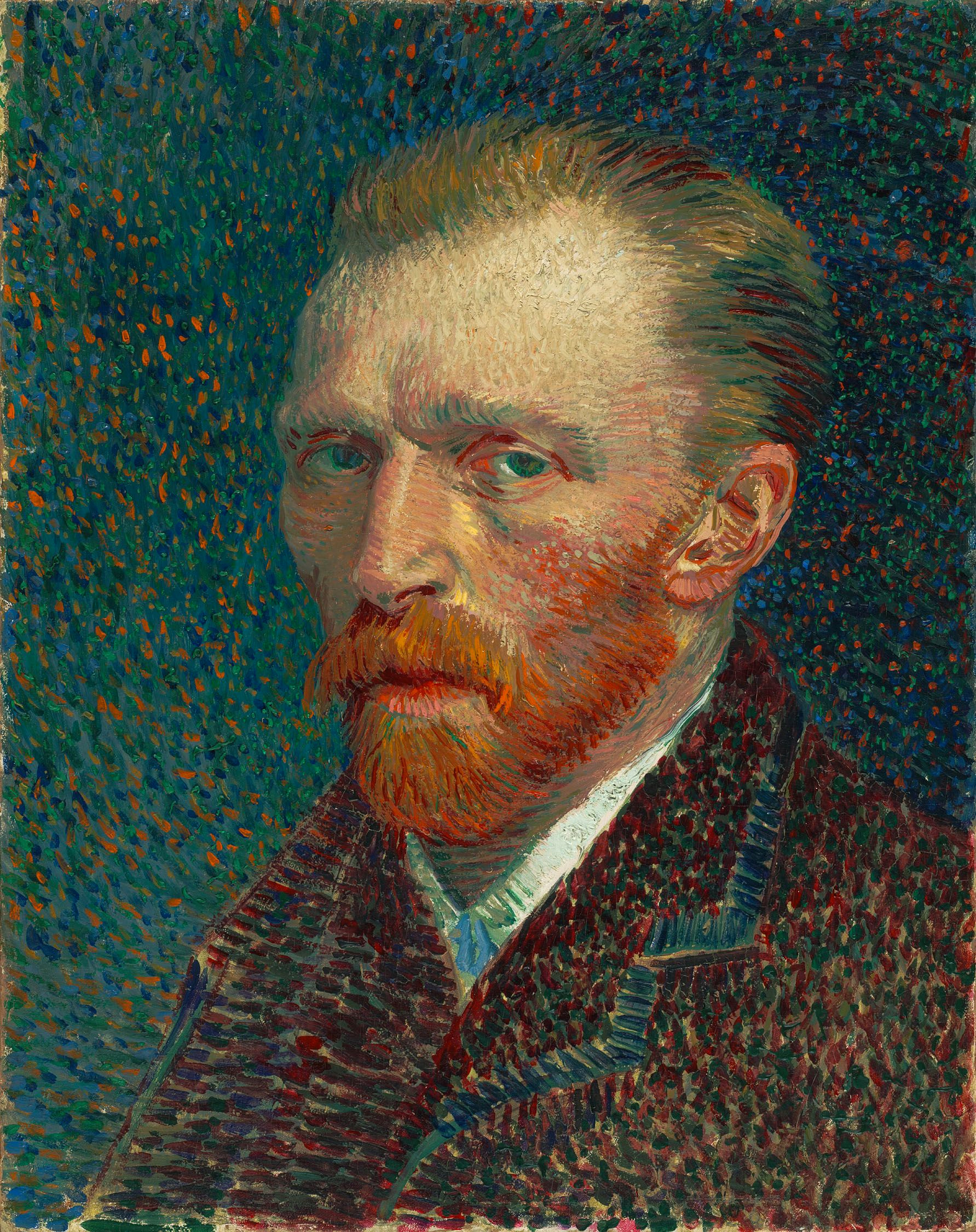
Vincent van Gogh, Self Portrait, 1887, using pointillist technique.

- Paint by number
- Paper craft
- Pholage artistic technique
- Plique-à-jour enameling technique
- Pointillé technique
- Pointillism
- Pouncing technique
- Pencil shading

== R ==
- Rapid visualization graphic artist technique
- Relief art technique
- Relief printing technique
- Repoussé and chasing technique
- Resin art technique
- Rubbing (art)

== S ==
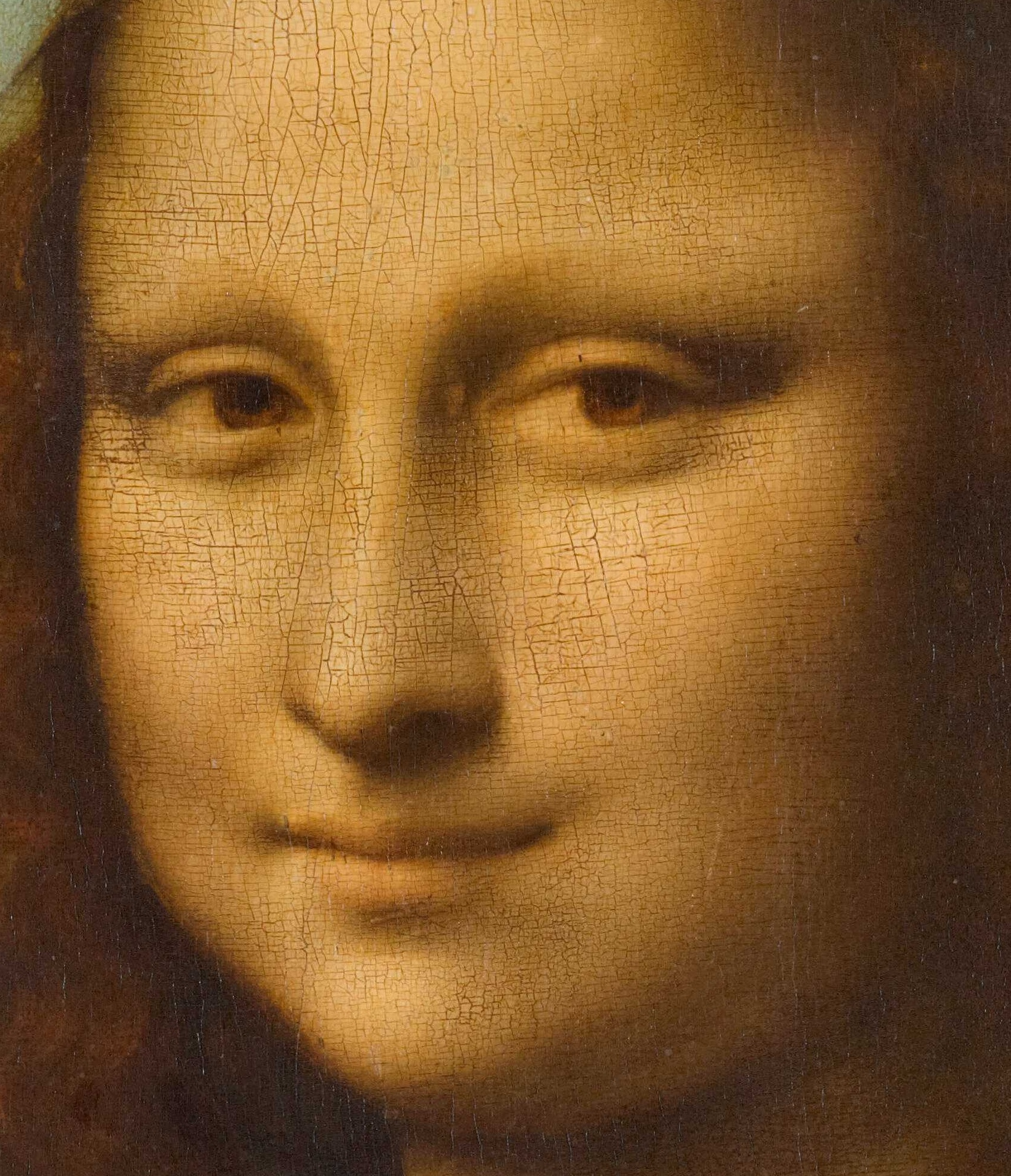
Detail of Leonardo da Vinci's Mona Lisa showing sfumato.

- Scratchitti graffiti
- Scratchboard
- Screen printing technique
- Screentone texture technique
- Sfumato technique
- Shading
- Sgraffito technique
- Soft sculpture
- Spray painting technique
- Stippling
- Still life

== T ==
- Tarashikomi
- Texture (painting)
- Transfer technique (drawing)
- Trompe-l'œil technique

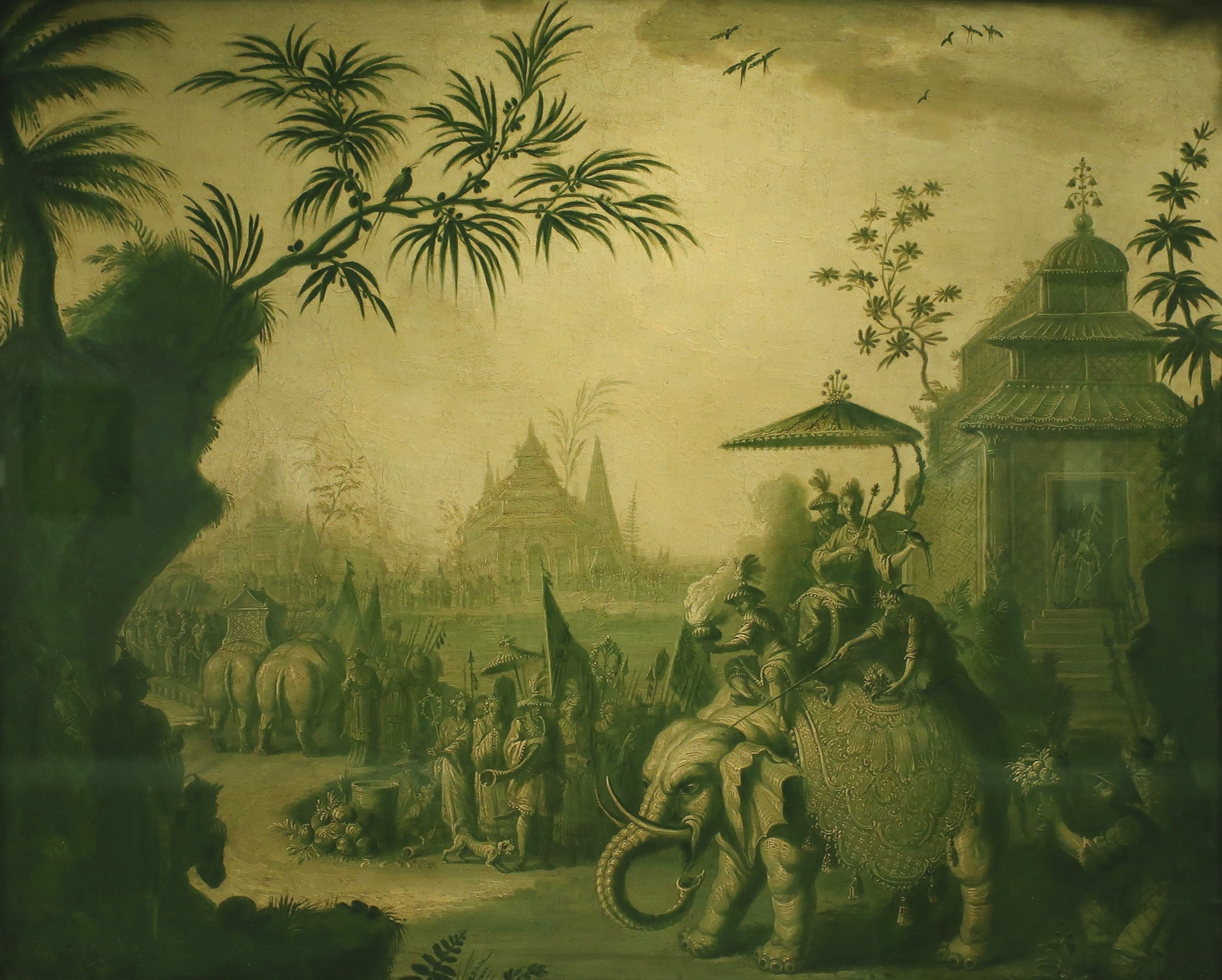
Verdaille example A Chinoiserie Procession of Figures Riding on Elephants with Temples Beyondby Jean-Baptiste Pillement

== U ==
- Underpainting

== V ==
- Verdaille (green shades technique)

== W ==
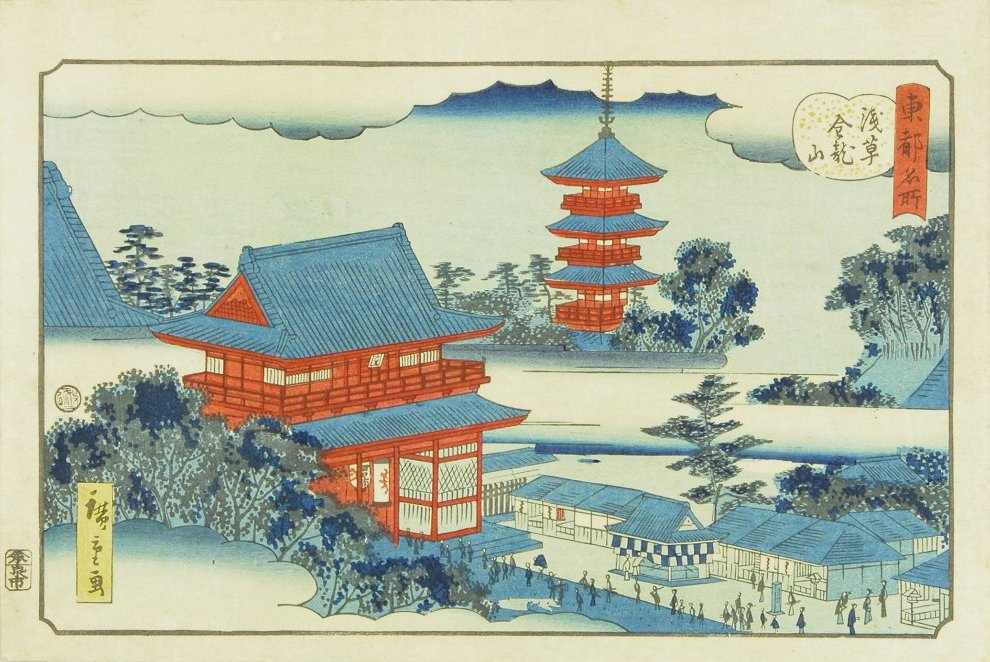
Example of Woodblock printing. Aizuri-e print: Kinryuzan Temple in Asakusa

- Watercolor painting
- Welded sculpture technique
- Wet-on-wet
- Wire sculpture
- Wood engraving technique
- Woodblock printing

== See also ==
- Art movement
- Creativity techniques
- Hockney–Falco thesis
- Kalliroscope
- List of art media
- List of artistic media
- List of art movements
- List of most expensive paintings
- List of most expensive sculptures
- List of sculptors
