= Bell Bay =

Bell Bay may refer to:

- Bell Bay (Antarctica), a bay in Antarctica
- Bell Bay, Tasmania, an industrial centre and port in Australia
