= Kristians Tonny =

French painter

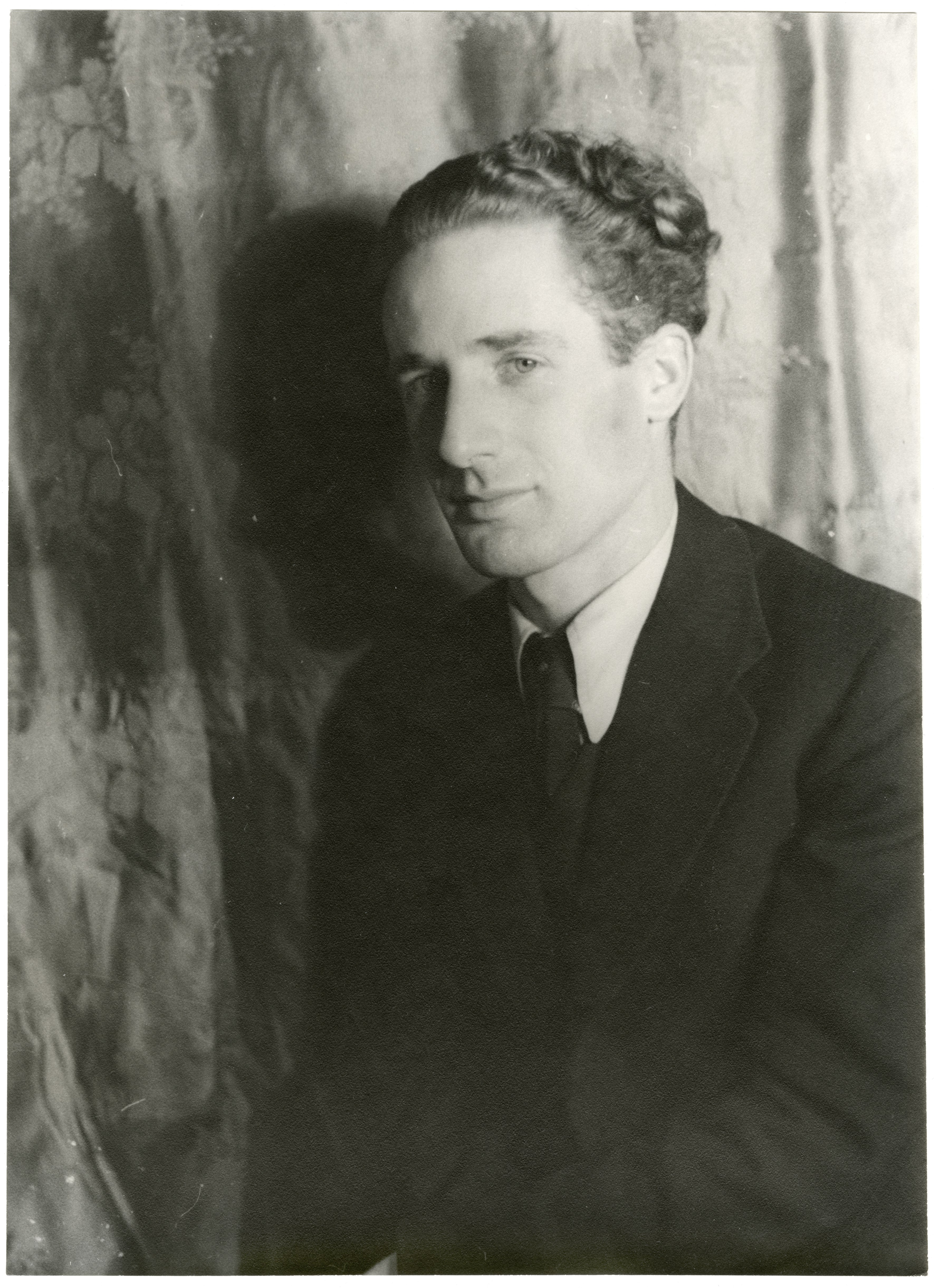
- Kristians Tonny in 1937
- Born: Tonny Kristians; 13 August 1907; Amsterdam, Netherlands
- Died: 20 June 1977 (aged 69); París, France
- Other names: Kleine Rembrandt; K. Tonny
- Occupations: Painting; Conceptual artist
- Years active: 1922 - 1977
- Known for: Surrealism

Tonny Kristians (September 13, 1907 — June 20, 1977), known as Kristians Tonny, was a Surrealist painter and draftsman whose career spanned from the 1920s through to the 1970s. Born in Amsterdam, he moved to Paris with his parents in 1913. Encouraged by his father, he began painting and drawing at an early age, which resulted in him securing his first exhibition at the Paris gallery Mouninou at the age of twelve and breaking through as an avant-garde artist in 1929. Later in life he suffered considerable setbacks both in his personal life and career, as a result of which interest in his work dwindled.

== Early life ==
His talent was recognized early on by his father, A. Kristians, who began to encourage him. He was made to stay at home and help his father in the studio. He also accompanied his parents wherever they went, and his exposure to Paris street-life, the cabarets and the cinema provided him with much of the inspiration for his early work.

He was considered a child prodigy and quickly became noticed. He had his first exhibition in 1920 at the Parisian gallery Mouninou, followed in 1924 by a first exhibition in the Netherlands at the Amsterdam artist's society De Kring.

When he was about 15 years old he also regularly visited the studio of draftsman Jules Pascin. He never was a formal apprentice of Pascin, yet learned a lot from him. In particular, he advanced the development of the transfer technique, a blind drawing technique thought up by Pascin as an experiment in free expression. Kristians Tonny perfected this technique and made it entirely his own.

== Life and career until 1939 ==
In 1925 he participated in the first major Surrealist exhibition, the Exposition Surréaliste at Galerie Pierre in Paris. Soon after he was regarded as an established artist, favored by the critics of the time and his work being bought by serious collectors.

He had befriended Gertrude Stein, the American poet, writer and collector of modern art, whose portrait he painted in 1930, being the second artist after Pablo Picasso to do so. Stein encouraged him to lease a studio on a long-term contract. A private quarrel lead to a major split between them and he decided to leave for Tangier, Morocco. Part of the reason for Tonny's disagreement with Stein and his departure for Tangier was Stein's disapproval of his relationship with his lover Anita Thompson. Stein tried separating them by arranging for Thompson to lose a job in France and be offered another in Tangier; instead Tonny followed Thompson. After about one year he returned to Europe, staying in France and in the Netherlands before definitively returning to Paris.

In the beginning of 1937 he departed, together with his first wife Marie Claire Ivanoff, to whom he was newly married, along with Paul Bowles and his future wife, the writer Jane Auer, and embarked on a journey that took them to the United States first, and from there to Mexico and Guatemala. In the United States his work was shown in various expositions. He sold work to collectors and museums and was assigned to paint a series of murals in a theater in Hartford, Connecticut.

The journey to Mexico meant the fulfillment of a long-held wish for him and from this time forward the Mexican landscape was never to disappear from his work. It was a turning point in his artistic development.

During the late 1930s Surrealist exhibitions were held in a number of major European cities and together with Georges Hugnet, Kristians Tonny was involved in organizing the first international Surrealist exhibition in the Netherlands, held in the art gallery owned by his parents, Galerie Robert in Amsterdam. Although a major event, the exhibition was not a complete success. The reason for this was that, with the exception of Kristians Tonny, no Dutch Surrealists (such as J.H. Moesman, Willem Wagenaar and Emile van Moerkerken) were invited. The reason for this being that Georges Hugnet didn't believe that, with the exception of Kristians Tonny, there were any Dutch Surrealists. Among those who did participate were André Breton, Max Ernst, Paul Eluard, E.L.T. Mesens and others. As a consequence, in the Netherlands a major interest in Surrealism didn't happen until the 1960s, something that, after his return to the Netherlands in 1949, proved to be a major inconvenience to Kristians Tonny in finding an audience for his work.

== Life and career after 1939 ==
During the Second World War Tonny stayed mostly in the south of France. He and his wife tried to emigrate to the United States, but, in spite of all the formalities having been completed, the journey didn't happen for reasons both financial and political. During the war, he did manage to take part in exhibitions in Monte-Carlo, even having one of his own there in 1942.

In 1944 he returned to Paris where he resumed his pre-war life again. He sold his works, made book illustrations and painted murals in the newly built casino in St. Malo. Having divorced from his wife Marie Claire, he lived together with Françoise Henry, with whom he had two daughters. In spite of this, he had difficulties, one reason being that the pre-war art scene in Paris had become non-existent. Additionally, private life difficulties led to an episode during which he sank into deep depression.

In 1949 he settled in Amsterdam, after having spent over 30 years abroad, and he married a second time, this time to Eeke van der Schaaf. From this marriage one daughter was born. He led a reclusive existence in the Netherlands and was not able to properly engage with the Dutch art community of that period, this being due, in some part, to the lack of interest in Surrealism at the time.

In spite of this, he remained very productive until several years before his death and he made in these years what many consider to be his finest work. Due to acceptance of his work not being successful, he became ever less well known, something that is continuing into the present.

In 1977 he died in Paris, as a consequence of pneumonia that went unrecognized.

Since his death Tonny remains an artist known only to a limited audience; rarely any original works from his hand are on show, either at auctions or at exhibitions, and it is reputed that many works remain unlocated, with only photographs surviving, though this is certainly not true.

== See also ==
- Transfer technique
