= Gradation (art) =

Art technique of slowly transitioning between color hues, shades, or textures

Crystal Gradation by Paul Klee, watercolour, 1921.

In the visual arts, gradation is the technique of gradually transitioning from one hue to another, or from one shade to another, or one texture to another. Space, distance, atmosphere, volume, and curved or rounded forms are some of the visual effects created with gradation.

A gradient illustration, showing a gradation spectrum from black to white.

Artists use a variety of methods to create gradation, depending upon the art medium, and the precise desired effect. Blending, shading, hatching and crosshatching are common methods. A fading effect can be created with pastels by using a torchon.

== Gradation in photography ==
Gradation can also be useful in composing photographs. The early decades of the development of photography involved much effort and experimentation aimed at improving gradation detail in photographs. Different materials were tested in producing lithographs and early photographs, with steady improvement in producing detailed gradation. In 1878, one photographer wrote:

The great defect of all the processes of photolithography described in the last section is that they can only be applied with advantage to the reproduction of drawings or subjects in which the gradation of shade is shown by lines or dots separated by white spaces of varying sizes and at varying intervals apart, as in line or stipple engravings and lithographs in line and chalk.

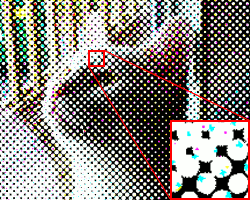
Example of a halftone reproduction of a photograph.

A major innovation was the development of halftone photography in the late 19th century. Halftone photography involves creating a reproduction of an original photograph by taking an image of it using a Photomechnical transfer camera (PMT), with a halftone screen as an intermediary tool to create gradation in the final reproduction. Halftone screens are a plate or film, made up of a continuous pattern of small dots, and when used in a photomechanical transfer camera, the halftone screen serves as an image filter. The invention of halftone photography was an important milestone, allowing photographs to be reproduced for mass publication in newspapers and magazines.

Analog photography is limited by the materials and equipment used by the photographer to capture gradation. These constraints are eliminated in digital photography, where software can be used to manipulate photograph images to create gradation.

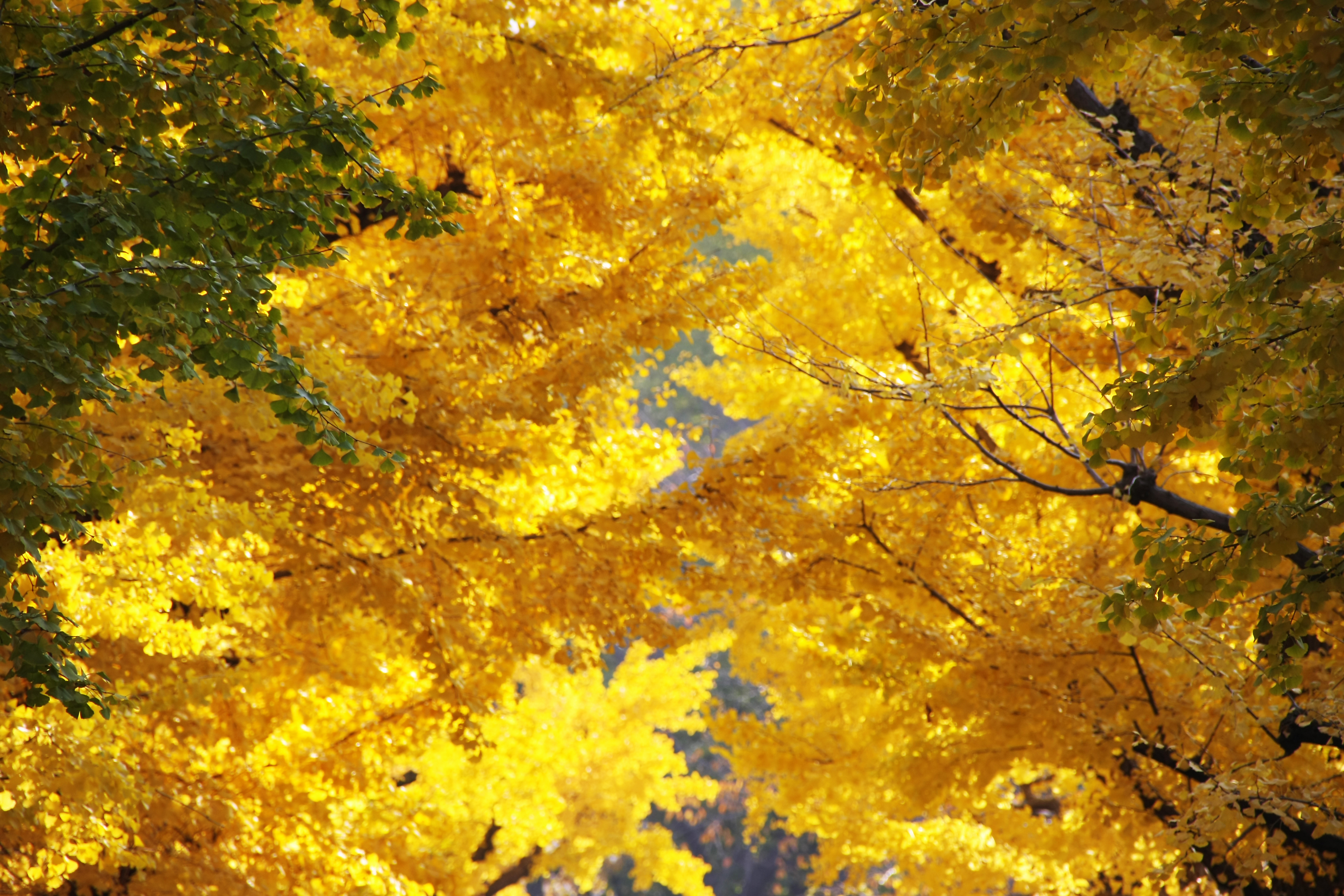
A photograph emphasizing gradation in the colour of autumn leaves in Yokoami, Tokyo, Japan.
