= Mount Saint Michael (disambiguation) =

Mount Saint Michael is a traditionalist Catholic religious facility in Spokane, Washington.

Mount Saint Michael may also refer to:

- Mount Saint Michael Academy, an all-boys Roman Catholic high school in the Bronx, New York
- Mount Saint Michael (Antarctica), a rocky point in Antarctica
- "Mt Saint Michel + Saint Michaels Mount", a song on the album Drukqs by Aphex Twin
- St Michael's Mount, an island and castle off the coast of Cornwall, England

== See also ==
- Mont-Saint-Michel, a historic abbey in Normandy, France
