= Chalice à soleil =

16th-century French chalice

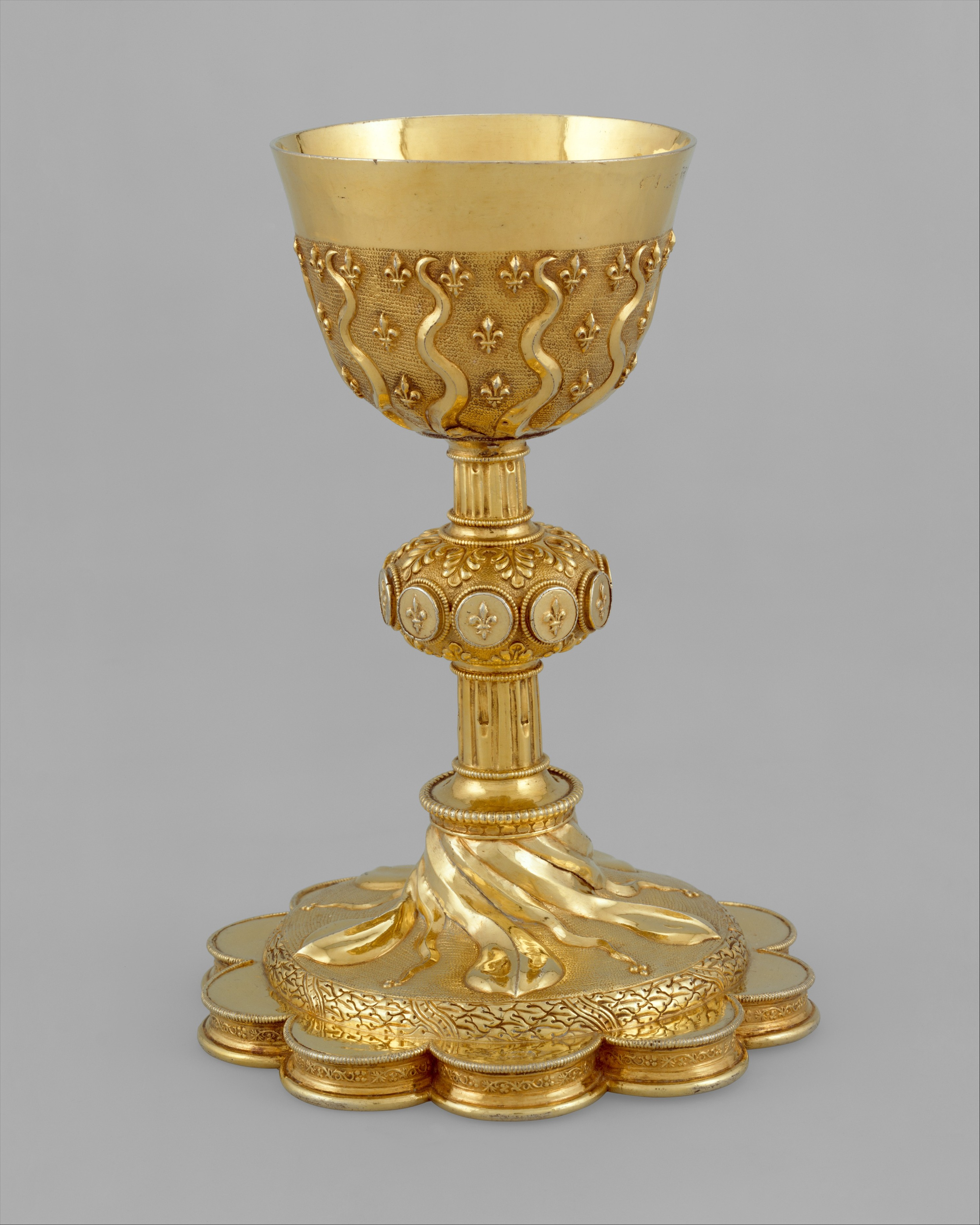
- Year: 1532–33
- Medium: Gilded silver
- Dimensions: 21 cm (8.3 in)
- Location: Metropolitan Museum of Art; New York City

The Chalice à soleil is a silver-gilt chalice dating to 16th century France, now in the Metropolitan Museum of Art in New York City.

== Description ==
Made in the first decades of the French Renaissance, the chalice is made from silver plated in gold. The cup is decorated with carving made in accordance with the School of Fontainebleau. Various motifs and symbols are depicted on the chalice; fleurs-de-lis are seen, as is an episcopal hat, shields, and various other French liturgical objects. As befitting a piece from the Early Renaissance, the cup's stem is similar to designs from the Roman Empire, the emulation of whose art and culture was a major driving force behind the Renaissance.
