= Shell gold =

Gilding product

In art history and the craft of gilding, shell gold is gold paint given its colour by very small pieces of real gold, normally obtained either from waste gold from goldsmithing and gilding, ground-up gold leaf, or fragments that have come off a gold-ground painting or other gilded object. The name comes from the medieval habit of using sea-shells to hold pigments and paints (of all colours) while painting. In painting it was usually used for details and highlights.

A common source is the collecting and processing of flakes of elemental gold that have flaked away from a surface during the process of gilding it. Once the flakes of leftover gold (called "skewings") have been gathered, they are mixed with a small amount of honey and ground together with a mortar and pestle until they become a powder. The honey is then removed by placing this mixture in a bath of hot water, leaving the gold flakes to collect at the bottom. The upper layer of water is poured off and the process is repeated several times, the last few with deionized water. Following the final rinse, the flakes are left to dry. Once the water has nearly evaporated, a drop of concentrated gum arabic is added and mixed into the flakes, creating a basic paint with gold flakes/ dust as pigment. The paint may be applied to a surface using either a brush or the tip of a finger, and can be "reactivated" by only the moisture in an exhaled breath of air.

Shell gold and powdered gold are the two principal forms of gold used for making repairs in a surface which has been previously gilded but has been damaged. Shell gold does not require any sizing, where as powdered gold does.
