= Silver-gilt =

Silver gilded with gold

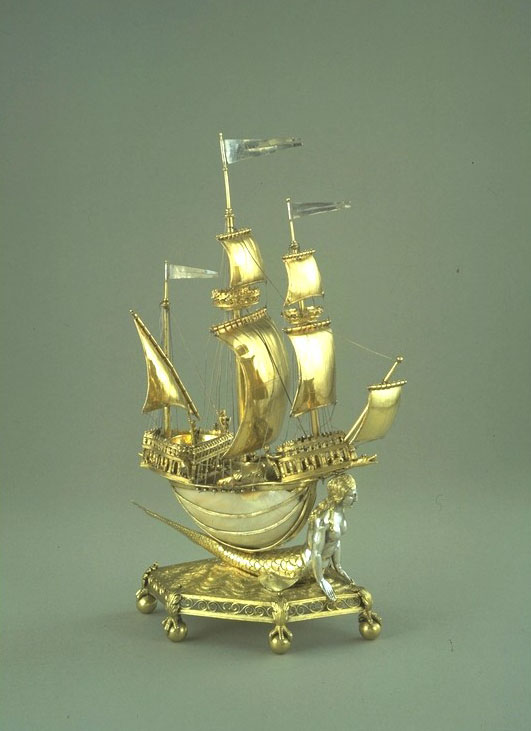
The Burghley Nef, silver-gilt (with sections ungilded), and nautilus shell, 1527–1528, France, V&A Museum

Silver-gilt or gilded/gilt silver, sometimes known in American English by the French term vermeil, is silver (either pure or sterling) which has been gilded. Most large objects made in goldsmithing that appear to be gold are actually silver-gilt; for example, most sporting trophies (including medals such as the gold medals awarded in all Olympic Games after 1912) and many crown jewels are silver-gilt objects.

Apart from the raw materials being much less expensive to acquire than solid gold of any karat, large silver-gilt objects are also noticeably lighter, as well as more durable. (Gold is about 1.7× heavier than lead and 1.8× heavier than silver and is easily scratched and bent.) For objects that have intricate detail such as monstrances, gilding greatly reduces the need for cleaning and polishing, and so reduces the risk of damage. Ungilded silver would suffer oxidation and need frequent polishing; gold does not oxidize at all. The "gold" threads used in embroidered goldwork are normally also silver-gilt.

A similar material is gilt-bronze, also known as ormolu.

== Techniques ==
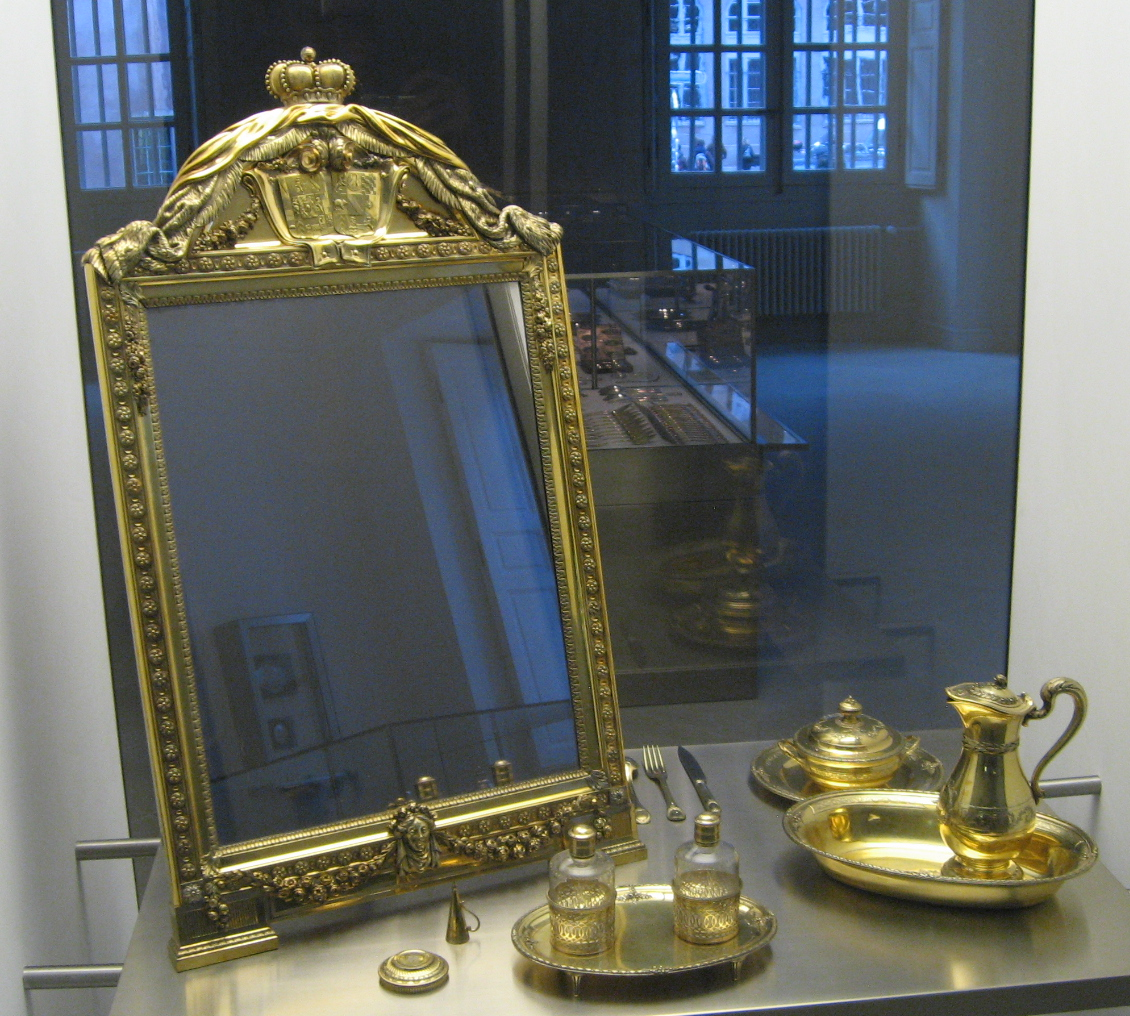
Silver gilt toilet service by Johann Jacob Kirstein, 1786

Silver-gilt objects have been made since ancient times across Eurasia, using a variety of gilding techniques. A distinctive depletion gilding technique was developed by the Incas in Pre-Columbian South America. "Overlaying" or folding or hammering on gold foil or gold leaf is mentioned in Homer's Odyssey (Bk vi, 232). Fire-gilding with mercury dates to at least the 4th century BC, and was the most common method until the Early Modern period at least. However, it put workers at risk of mercury poisoning and often caused blindness among French artisans who refined the technique in the 18th century. Electroplating is now the most commonly used method: it involves no mercury and is therefore much safer. Keum-boo is a special Korean technique of depletion gilding. In China gilt-bronze, also known as ormolu, was more common.

== Vermeil ==
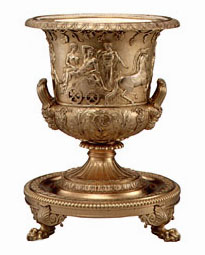
A vermeil wine cooler manufactured in 1810 by Paul Storr is located in the Vermeil Room of the White House.

Vermeil (/ˈvɜːrmɪl/ or /vərˈmeɪ/; French: [vɛʁˈmɛj]) is an alternative for the usual term silver-gilt. It is a French word adopted into American English language in the 19th century, and is rare in British English. "Vermeil" can also refer to gilt bronze, a material even less costly than silver.

By US Code of Federal Regulations 16, Part 23.4: "An industry product may be described or marked as 'vermeil' if it consists of a base of sterling silver coated or plated on all significant surfaces with gold, or gold alloy of not less than 10-karat fineness, that is of reasonable durability and a minimum thickness throughout equivalent to two and one half (2 1/2) microns (or approximately 100/1000000ths of an inch) of fine gold."

== Considerations in use ==
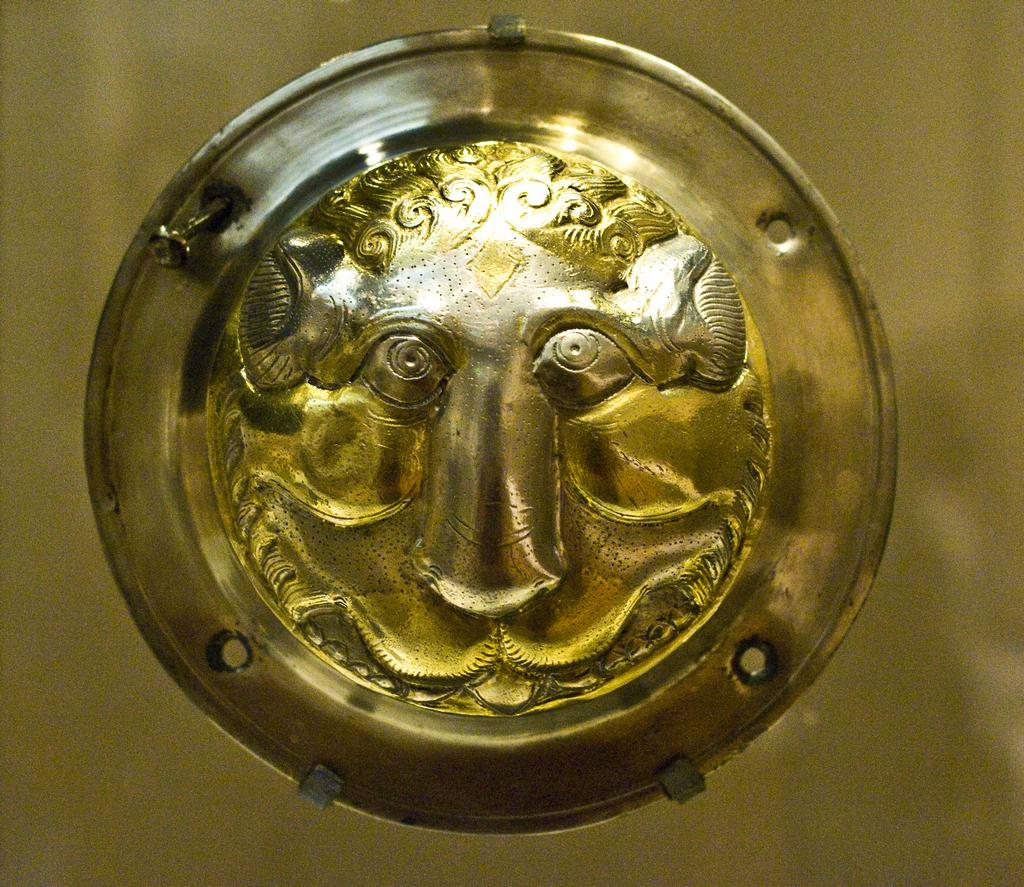
Sassanid silver-gilt shield-boss, 7th century

Silver objects can be gilded at any point, not just when first made, and items regularly handled, such as toilet service sets for dressing-tables or tableware, often needed regilding after a few years as the gold wears off. In 18th century London, silversmiths charged 3 shillings per ounce of silver for an initial gilding, and 1 shilling and 9 pence per ounce for regilding. In parcel-gilt cups, only the interior is gilded, perhaps to prevent contamination of drinks with tarnish cleaning chemicals.

Fully silver-gilt items are visually indistinguishable from gold, and were no doubt often thought to be solid gold. When the English Commonwealth sold the Crown Jewels of England after the execution of Charles I they were disappointed in the medieval "Queen Edith's Crowne, formerly thought to be of massy gold, but upon trial found to be of silver gilt", which was valued at only £16, compared to £1,110 for the "imperial crowne". The English Gothic Revival architect Sir George Gilbert Scott was concerned by the deception in this. He accepted gilding of the interior only, but with all-over gilding "we ... reach the actual boundary of truth and falsehood; and I am convinced that if we adopt this custom we overstep it.... why make our gift look more costly than it is? We increase its beauty, but it is at the sacrifice of truth." Indeed, some Early Medieval silver-gilt Celtic brooches had compartments apparently for small lead weights to simulate the weight of solid gold.

== See also ==
- Category:Silver-gilt objects
- Vermeil Room, in which the White House's extensive collection is displayed

== General and cited references ==
- Inventory of the goods, jewels, etc., sold by order of the Council of State from the several places and palaces following:--The Tower Jewel-Houses, Somerset House, Whitehall, Greenwich, Wimbledon, Oatlands, Windsor, Hampton Court, Richmond, Sion House, St. James's, and several other places; with the several contracts made by the contractors for sale of the said goods, etc., from the year 1646 to the year 1652. British Library, Harleian Ms. Article
- Glanville, Philippa. Silver in England, Taylor & Francis, 2006, ISBN 0-415-38215-7, ISBN 978-0-415-38215-1
- Koopman Rare Art. Gilt-edged Splendour: Masterpieces in Silver Gilt, with photographs by Guy Hills, John Adamson, 2013, ISBN 1-898565-12-0, ISBN 978-1-898565-12-3
- Scott, Sir George Gilbert, Remarks on secular & domestic architecture, present & future, John Murray, 1857. Google books
- Strong, Donald Emrys. Greek and Roman Gold and Silver Plate, Taylor & Francis, 1979, ISBN 0-416-72510-4, ISBN 978-0-416-72510-0
