= Rapid visualization =

Rapid visualization (also known as rapid vis) is a technique used by graphic artists to create a drawing of a concept in several stages.

After the completion of thumbnail drawings, a preferred drawing is selected and rendered in full size, usually in pencil. Then a sheet of paper (layout bond) is put over the drawing and it is redrawn/traced with corrections, additions, and alterations. This process is repeated several times, often with color added at some stage, until the image is perfected to the desire of the artist.

The purpose of rapid vis is to take an idea from concept to accurate rendering without having to start over from scratch each time an edit or alteration is desired. The completed drawing is usually still considered a rough layout or comprehensive for approval submission (as opposed to finished art for framing or camera-ready art for reproduction).

== See also ==
- Art movement
- Creativity techniques
- List of art media
- List of artistic media
- List of art movements
- List of most expensive paintings
- List of most expensive sculptures
- List of art techniques
- List of sculptors
