= Krings (surname) =

Krings is a German surname. Notable people with the surname include:

- Armin Krings (born 1962), Luxembourgian footballer
- Doresia Krings (born 1977), Austrian snowboarder and Olympics competitor
- Ernest Krings (1920–2017), Belgian baron, judge, and legal scholar
- Günter Krings (born 1969), German lawyer and politician
- Heidi Krings (born 1983), Austrian snowboarder and Olympics competitor

== See also ==
- Kring (disambiguation), a similarly spelled surname, place name, etc.
