= Keum-boo =

Korean gilding technique

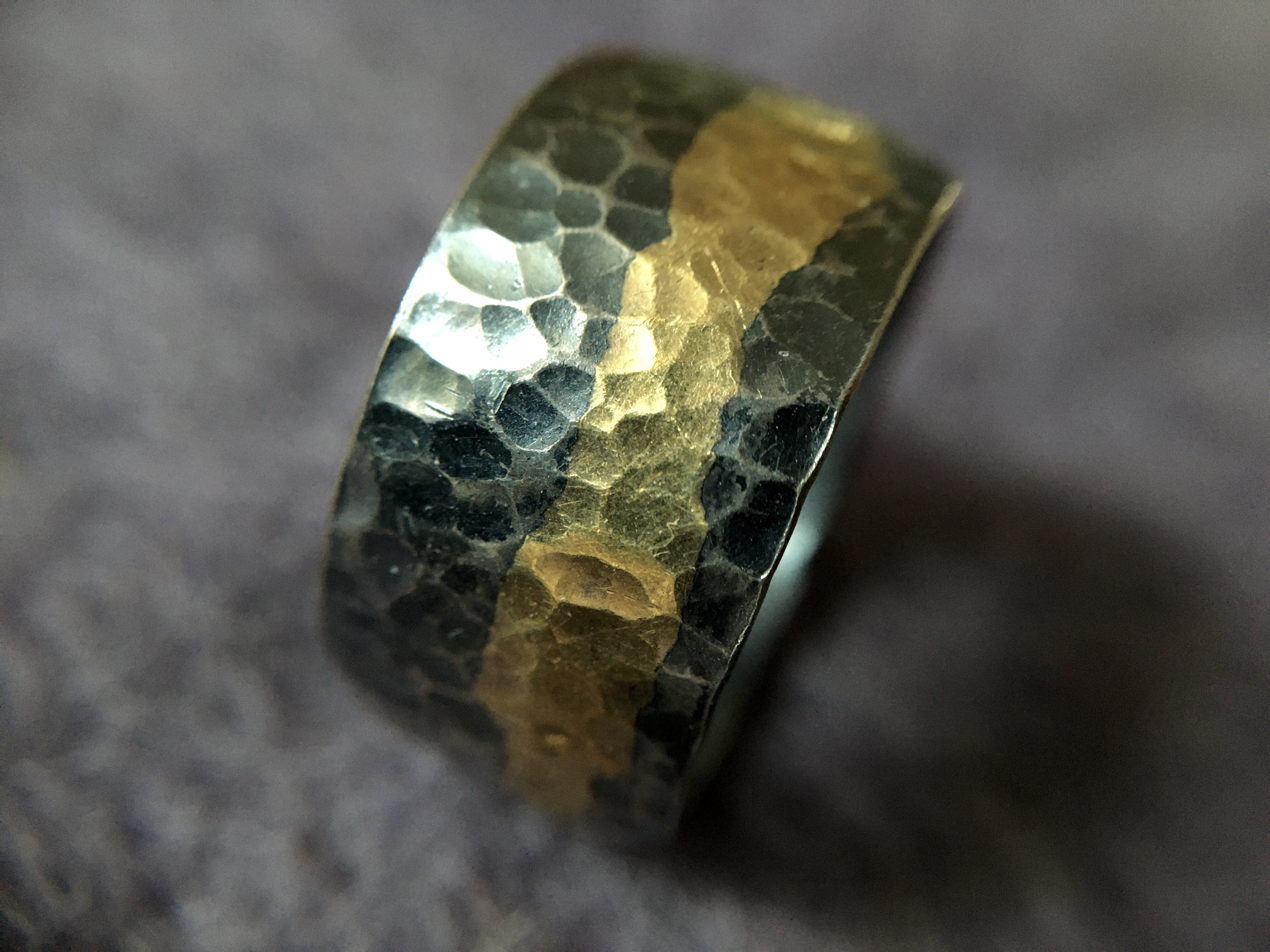
- Silver ring gilded with 0.4 mm gold with the keum-boo technique, hammered and blackened

Korean name
- Hangul: 금부
- Hanja: 金鈇
- RR: geumbu
- MR: kŭmbu

Keum-boo (Korean: 금부; also Geumbu, Kum-Boo or Kum-bu—Korean "attached gold") is an ancient Korean gilding technique used to apply thin sheets of gold to silver, to make silver-gilt. Traditionally, this technique is accomplished by first depleting a surface of sterling silver to bring up a thin layer of fine silver. Then 24 carat gold foil is applied with heat and pressure—mechanical gilding—to produce a permanent diffusion bond.

Pure precious metals such as gold and silver have a very similar atomic structure and therefore have a good potential for bonding. Heating these metals to a temperature between 260–370°C increases the movement of the atoms. When pressure is added, this causes an electron exchange at the surface between the two metals, creating a permanent diffusion bond. This diffusion bond occurs far below the soldering temperature for either metal (Dhein, 2004).

Examples of this technique have probably been observed, but not positively identified on pieces from the second half of the first millennium B.C. and from the early first millennium A.D. (Oddy, 1981).

This technique is used in many cultures, including Chinese, Japanese and in the West to bond gold to other metals, including iron, copper, aluminum, gold alloys, white gold, palladium and platinum. Foil made from gold alloys can be applied to silver and other metals by first depletion gilding the surface of the foil (Lewton-Brain, 1987–1993).

== See also ==
- Art movement
- Creativity techniques
- List of art media
- List of artistic media
- List of art movements
- List of most expensive paintings
- List of most expensive sculptures
- List of art techniques
- List of sculptors
