= Froissage =

Artistic collage technique

Froissage is a method of collage developed by Czech artist Ladislav Novák in which the lines made by crumpling up a piece of paper are used to create a drawing. One major exponent of the art of froissage is Jiří Kolář.

In his lifetime, Kolář acquired a reputation as one of the most inventive 20th-century Czech artists. A member of Group 42 and the first Czech Group of Experimental Poetry, he assisted in the development of the collage techniques of froissage and confrontage. During that time, writing poems and crumpling up pieces of paper were considered subversive activities and were discouraged by the then-powerful Communist regime. Kolář endured harassment and imprisonment, and eventually emigrated to France, where he was finally able to attain international renown for his work.

Froissage is a unique art in which the contours of a crumpled piece of paper are used to create a drawing. Currently on display in a small gallery at the French Institute, Kolář's froissages incorporate previously existing 17th-century French drawings to form more modern, abstract pictures. The results occasionally can be likened to early Cubist efforts to capture multiple motions and images within a single frame.

== See also ==
- Art movement
- Creativity techniques
- List of art media
- List of artistic media
- List of art movements
- List of most expensive paintings
- List of most expensive sculptures
- List of art techniques
- List of sculptors
