= Pholage =

Pholage is an artistic technique and method of graphic reproduction invented by Manuel Bennett in 1959.

An extension of collage, instead of consisting of mounting numerous pieces of colored paper or other material to make one original, pholage consists of taking positive or negative photographic film images, cutting out sections called "masks", and reassembling them to create a varied reproduction of the original. Additional drawings can be added to the color-separated original to further manipulate the original.

While collage yields a single piece of art, pholage can be reproduced by exposing photosensitive paper through the mask, or any other reproductive technique.

== See also ==
- Art movement
- Creativity techniques
- List of art media
- List of artistic media
- List of art movements
- List of most expensive paintings
- List of most expensive sculptures
- List of art techniques
- List of sculptors
- Scanner art (scanner collage)
