= Mount Saint Michael (Antarctica) =

Mountain in Antarctica

Coordinates: 67°10′S 58°21′E

Mount Saint Michael is a prominent rocky point at the west side of the entrance to Bell Bay in Enderby Land. Discovered in February 1936 by Discovery Investigations personnel on the William Scoresby, and probably named by them for its resemblance to Le Mont-Saint-Michel on the French coast.
