= Kring Islands =

Islands in Kemp Land, Antarctica

- Location within Antarctica

Geography
- Location: Antarctica
- Coordinates: 67°10′S 58°30′E

Administration
- Administered under the Antarctic Treaty System

Demographics
- Population: Uninhabited

The Kring Islands are a group of two islands and numerous rocks lying on the east side of Bell Bay along the coast of Enderby Land, Antarctica. They were mapped as a single island by Norwegian cartographers from air photos taken by the Lars Christensen Expedition, 1936–37, and named Kringla (the ring). Australian National Antarctic Research Expeditions air photos of 1959 show the feature to be more than one island.

== See also ==
- List of Antarctic and sub-Antarctic islands
