= Bell Bay (Antarctica) =

Bay in Antarctica

Bell Bay (67°11′S 58°25′E) is a bay situated between Mount Saint Michael and the Kring Islands along the coast of Kemp Land. It was mapped by Norwegian cartographers from air photos taken by the Lars Christensen Expedition, 1936–37, and named Indrefjord ("inner fjord"); it was renamed by the Antarctic Names Committee of Australia for Sergeant S. Bell, RAAF, wireless fitter at Mawson Station in 1959.
