= Depletion gilding =

Metallurgy technique

Depletion gilding is a method for producing a layer of nearly pure gold on an object made of gold alloy by removing the other metals from its surface. It is sometimes referred to as a "surface enrichment" process.

== Process ==
Most gilding methods are additive: they deposit gold that was not there before onto the surface of an object. By contrast, depletion gilding is a subtractive process whereby material is removed to increase the purity of gold that is already present on an object's surface.

In depletion gilding, other metals are etched away from the surface of an object composed of a gold alloy by the use of acids or salts, often in combination with heat. Since no gold is added, only an object made of an alloy that already contains gold can be depletion gilded.

Depletion gilding relies on the fact that gold is highly resistant to oxidation or corrosion by most common chemicals, whereas many other metals are not. Depletion gilding is most often used to treat alloys of gold with copper or silver. Unlike gold, both copper and silver readily react with a variety of chemicals. For example, nitric acid is effective as an etching agent for both copper and silver. Under the proper circumstances, even ordinary table salt will react with either metal.

The object to be gilded is coated, immersed, or packed in a suitable acid or salt, and usually heated to speed the process. These chemicals then attack the metallic copper and silver in the object's surface, transforming it to various copper and silver compounds. The resulting copper and silver compounds can be removed from the object's surface by a number of processes. Washing, chemical leaching, heating, or even physical absorption by porous materials such as brick dust have all been used historically. Meanwhile, the relatively inert gold is left unaffected. The result is a thin layer of nearly pure gold on the surface of the original object.

There is no well-defined minimum gold content required to successfully depletion gild an object. However, the less gold that is present, the more other material must be etched away to produce the desired surface appearance. In addition, the removal of the other metals usually leaves the surface covered with microscopic voids and pits. This can make the surface soft and "spongy" with a dull or matte appearance. This effect becomes more pronounced as more base metal is removed. For this reason, most depletion gilded objects are burnished to make their surfaces more durable and give them a more attractive polished finish.

Like other gilding processes, depletion gilding provides a way to produce the appearance of pure gold without its disadvantages: its cost and rarity, and its softness and denseness. By producing a layer of gold over a layer of copper or other metal, objects can be made that are lighter, sturdier, and cheaper while still appearing to be nearly pure gold.

== Variations ==
The term depletion gilding usually refers to the production of a layer of gold. However, it can also be used to produce a layer that is an alloy of gold and silver, sometimes referred to as electrum. Certain chemicals, such as oxalic acid, attack copper but do not affect either silver or gold. Using such a chemical, it is possible to remove only the copper in an alloy, leaving both silver and the gold behind. Thus, if the original object is composed of copper, silver, and gold, it can be given a gold surface by removing both silver and copper, or an electrum surface by removing only the copper.

Likewise, with an appropriate chemical, a layer of nearly pure silver can be produced on an object made of copper and silver. For instance, sterling silver can be depleted—'depletion silvering'—to produce a fine silver surface, perhaps as preamble to application of gold, as in the Keum-boo technique.

However, in the majority of cases depletion gilding is in fact used to produce a gold finish, rather than one of electrum or silver.

== Applications ==
Depletion gilding is a decorative process, with no significant industrial applications. It is not widely used in modern times, having been superseded by electroplating. Some individual artisans and small shops continue to practice it.

However, depletion gilding was widely used in antiquity. While it requires skill to execute it well, the process itself is technologically simple, and uses chemicals that were readily available to most ancient civilizations. Some form of depletion gilding has been used by nearly every culture that developed metalworking. The South American Sican culture in particular developed depletion gilding to a high art. Some ancient alloys, such as tumbaga, may have been developed specifically for use in depletion gilding. The technique was not known to be used by Anglo-Saxons until the twenty-first century, when detailed examination with electron microscopes of treasures such as the Staffordshire Hoard revealed its use.
