= Hatching =

Art technique of using closely-spaced parallel lines for shading

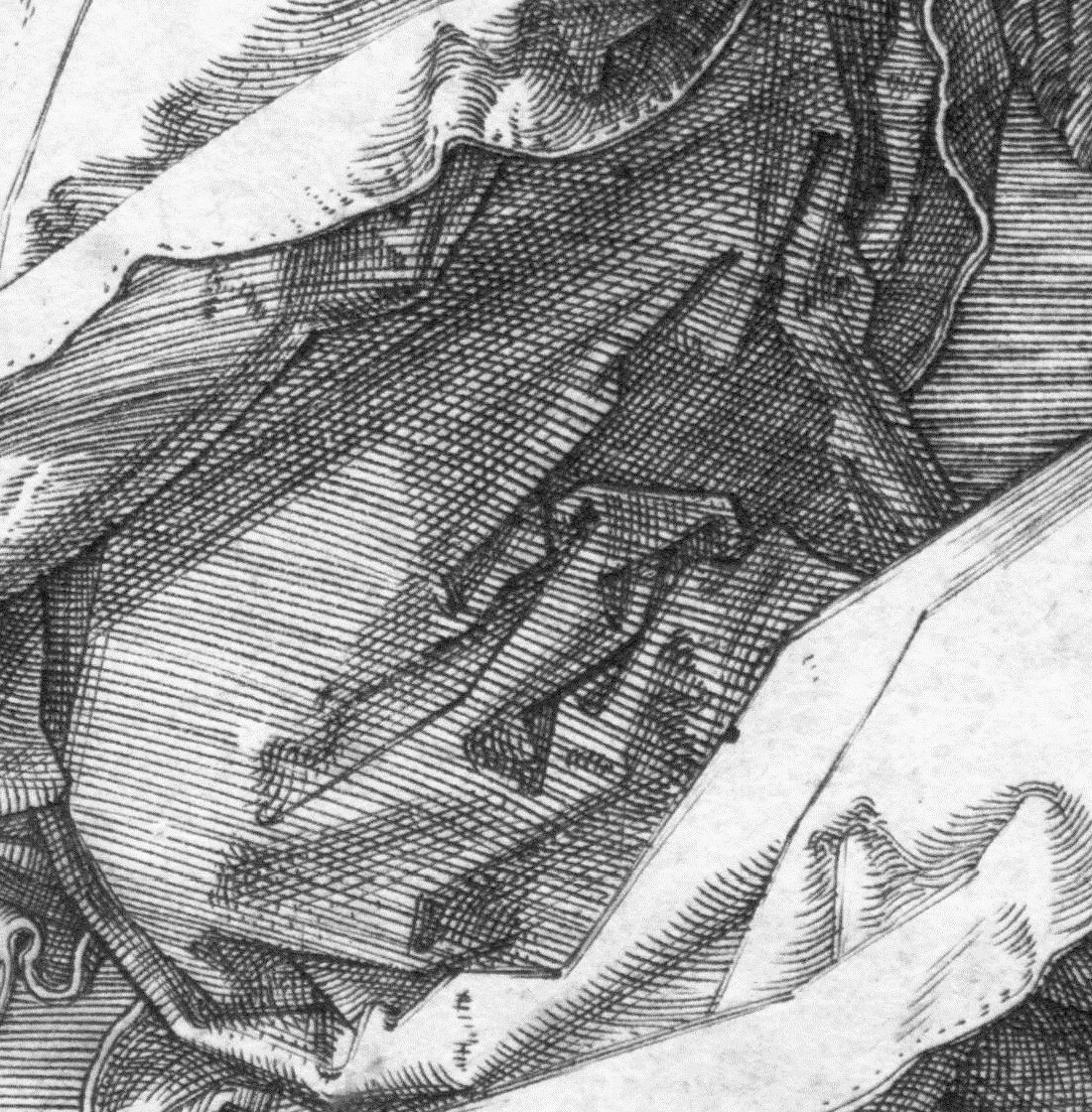
Detail of Albrecht Dürer's Veronica, featuring hatching (e.g., background) and cross-hatching in many darker areas

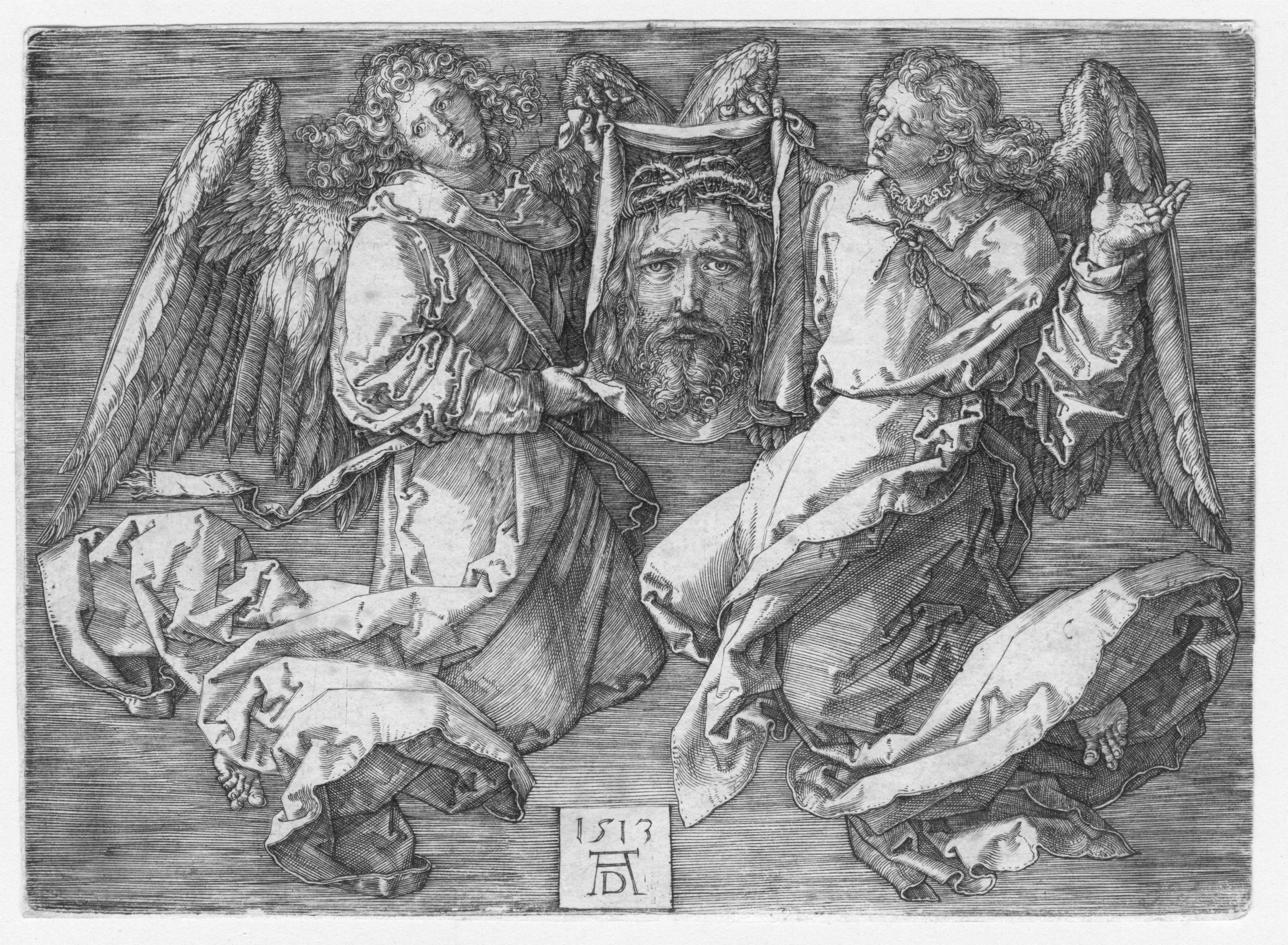
The full engraving

Hatching (French: hachure) is an artistic technique used to create tonal or shading effects by drawing, painting, or scribing closely spaced parallel lines. When lines are placed at an angle to one another, it is called cross-hatching. Hatching is also sometimes used to encode colours in monochromatic representations of colour images, particularly in heraldry.

Hatching is especially important in essentially linear media, such as drawing and many forms of printmaking, such as engraving, etching, and woodcut. In Western art, hatching originated in the Middle Ages and developed further into cross-hatching, especially in the old master prints of the fifteenth century. Master ES and Martin Schongauer in engraving and Erhard Reuwich and Michael Wolgemut in woodcut were pioneers of both techniques. Albrecht Dürer in particular perfected the technique of crosshatching in both media.

Artists use the technique by varying the length, angle, closeness, and other qualities of the lines, most commonly in drawing, linear painting, and engraving.

== Technique ==
The main concept is that the quantity, thickness and spacing of the lines will affect the brightness of the overall image and emphasize forms creating the illusion of volume. Optically, brighter (less hatched) areas appear closer and darker (more hatched) areas appear further away, thus the number, spacing, and thickness of hatch lines can create the illusion of depth and volume on a two-dimensional surface like drawing paper or a printed image.

Hatching lines should always follow (i.e. wrap around) the form. By increasing quantity, thickness and closeness, a darker area will result.

An area of shading next to another area which has lines going in another direction is often used to create contrast.

Line work can be used to represent colors, typically by using the same type of hatch to represent particular tones. For example, red might be made up of lightly spaced lines, whereas green could be made of two layers of perpendicular dense lines, resulting in a realistic image.

Crosshatching is the technique of using line to shade and create value.

=== Variations ===
Linear hatching
Hatching in parallel lines. Normally the lines follow the direction of the described plane.
Crosshatching
Layers of hatching applied at different angles to create different textures and darker tones. At its simplest, a layer of linear hatching is laid over another layer at a 90° angle, to which further diagonal layers may be added. Other methods include layering arbitrary intersecting patches. Crosshatching in which layers intersect at slight angles can create a rippled moiré effect.
Contoured hatching
Hatching using curved lines to describe light and form of contours.

== Representation of materials ==
In technical drawing, the section lining may indicate the material of a component part of an assembly. Many hatching patterns have been standardized by the American National Standards Institute (ANSI) and the International Standards Organization (ISO), though there are many other predefined patterns that may be used. Thus, the hatching pattern of steel varies from that of aluminum, copper, etc. The patterns are not only for metals. Patterns for grass, gravel, brick, and others are frequently found on architectural drawings.

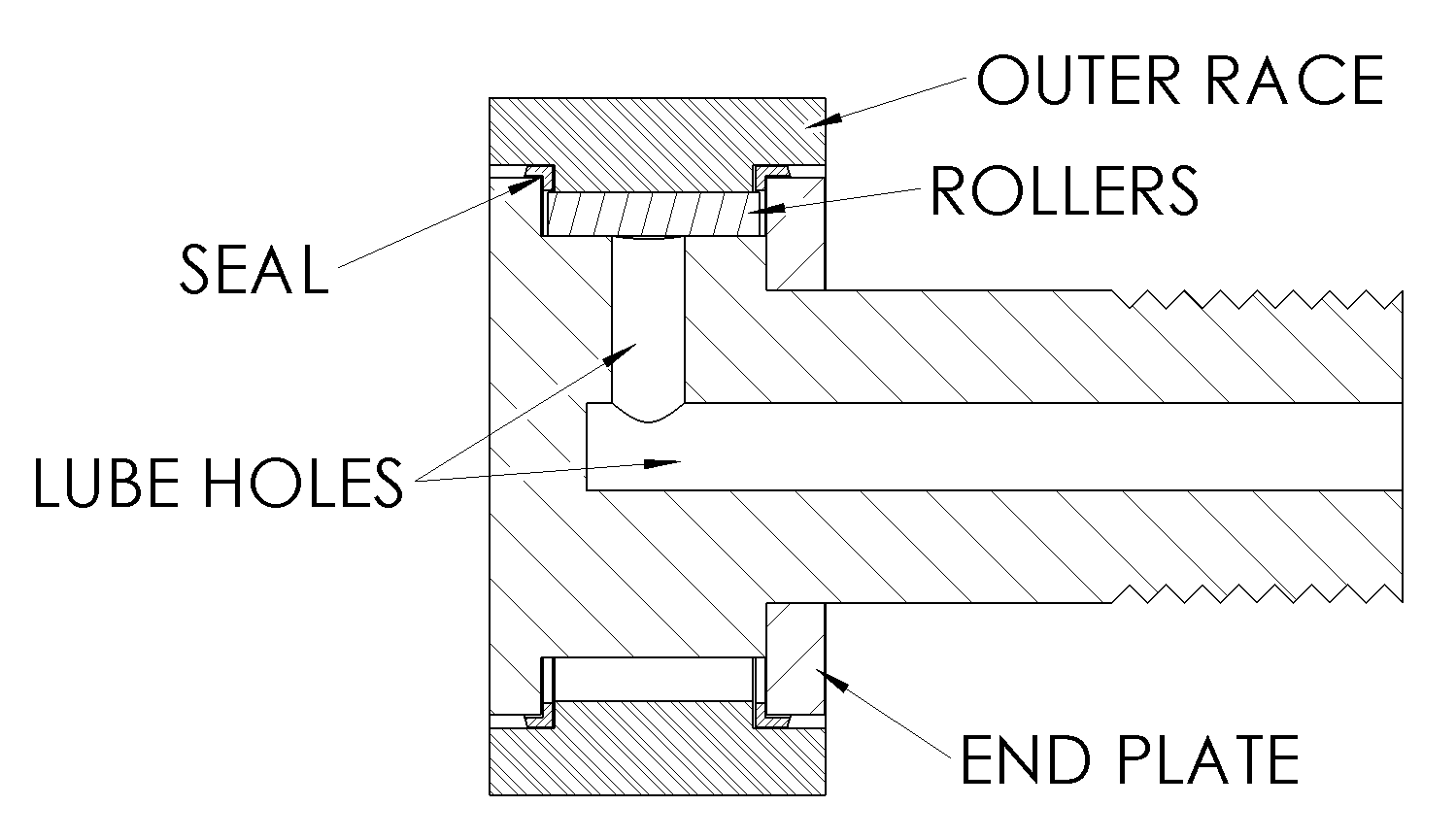
Cross section of a cam follower stud. Notice the double lines for the steel pattern of the "outer race" component. Also, the commonly used pattern of diagonal lines and variations of it are shown.

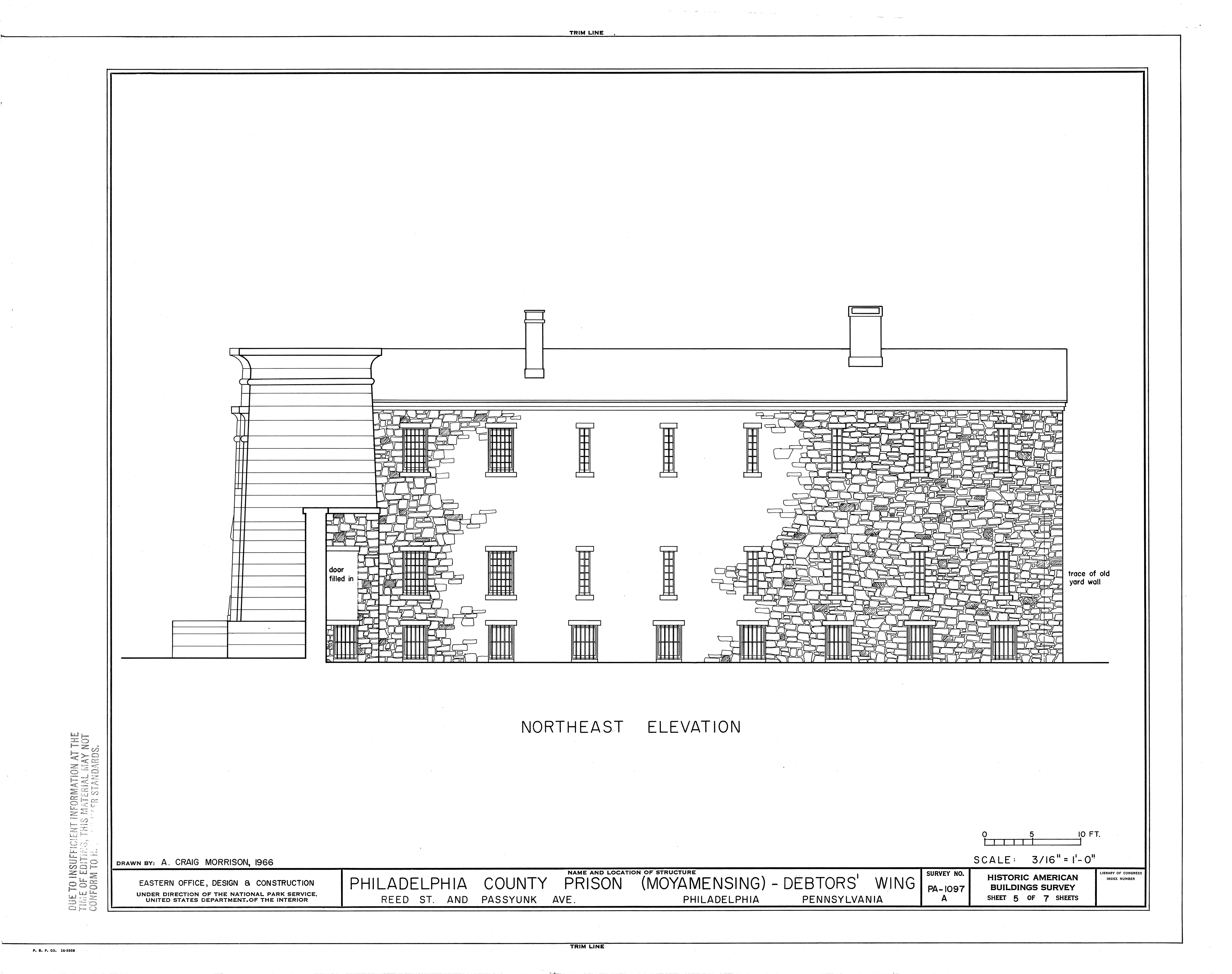
A drawing from the 1960s. Partial hatching on the stone facade is used for clarity.

== See also ==
- Cartography: use of hatched and cross-hatched areas on maps
- Dip pen
- Hatching (heraldry)
- Printmaking
- Stippling
