= Koninklijke Oost- en Westvlaamsche Kring =

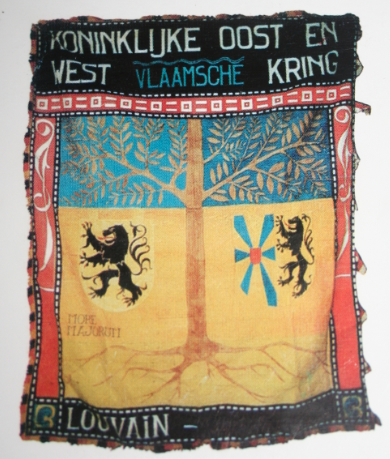
Flag of the Vla-Vla

The Koninklijke Oost- en Westvlaamsche Kring is a bilingual (French and Flemish) and nonpolitical student fraternity from Leuven (Belgium) founded November 22, 1922. This fraternity is commonly called the Vla-Vla. The members are originally from or living in East and West Flanders.

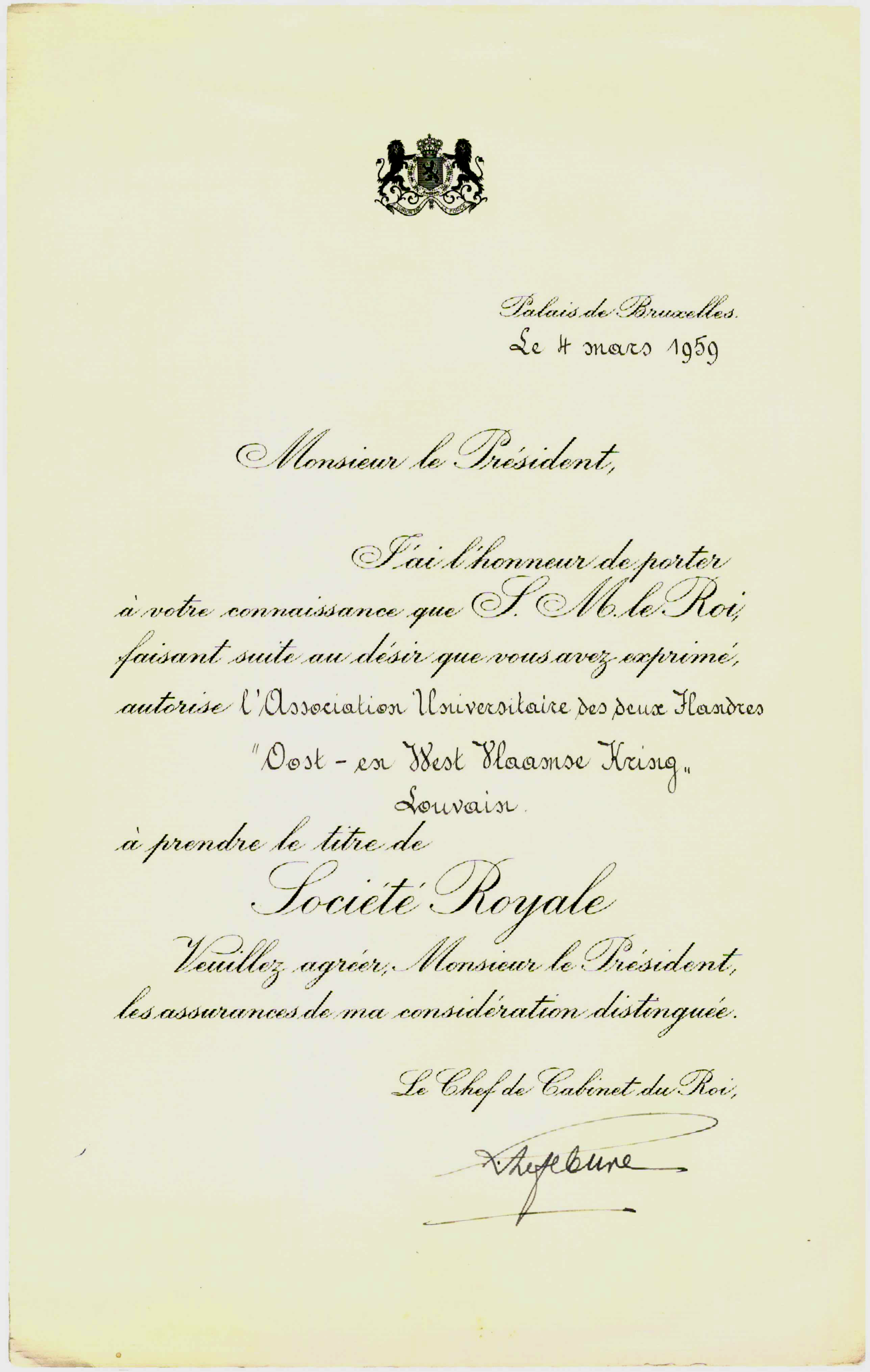
Official letter from the King of Belgians hoisting the fraternity to the rank of Royal Society.

== The traditions ==
=== Gatherings ===
- The Dies Natalis and the banquet. This event was introduced for the 25 years of the Vla-Vla. It takes place every year in Bruges (Codex Art. 149–153).
- The Oath of the Zilveren Lepelaar. This event took place in 1954. At that particular time, Bob Houben suggested to Veterans to sign the "Oath of the Zilveren Lepelaar", also called the "Oath of Bruges." By this oath the signing members agreed to meet every first Sunday after Easter in Bruges without any warning to celebrate the Vla-Vla. The signatories who are still alive still honor this oath .
  The oath of the zilveren lepelaar
- The Mosselsouper. This event is held once a year at "La Moule Sacrée" in Brussels. This is the night where the personal caps are awarded following a very special ritual.
- The Vla Vla prom is an annual event held in honor of the Vla-Vla (Codex Art.154 to 157).
- The Cantus or Corona. These are the regular and official gatherings between members and elders of the Vla-Vla.
- The indoctrination is an evening where the aspirants are interviewed by the committee about their knowledge of songs and the Codex (Codex s.126 to 129)
- The Baptism. This is the most important activity in order to become an aspiring member. The newcomers will automatically become active members at the baptism of the following year (Codex s.130 to 142).
- The taking of the gown and the contest to become "the King of newcomers". This activity takes place after the baptism when the Blues get their gown(Codex Art.143 to 148).
- The tour of the old market. This event organized annually by the Vla-Vla takes place on the "Oude Markt" in Leuven. The challenge is to go around the square, stopping in each coffee for fifteen minutes to drink a beer. All members of student organizations are allowed to participate.
- The Clubnights. Those Unofficial gathering are theoretically held every Tuesday at the Cafe "In Den Boule" in Leuven.

=== Distinctive signs ===
- The cap worn at the Vla-Vla is burgundy-colored and has the letters "VLA-VLA" sported on it. Each member has a personal cap that he earned during a special event.
- The gown worn at the Vla-Vla is red and gray (Codex Art.57). Each member has his personal gown. It is only worn during the Corona, the external and exceptional gatherings (Codex Art. 58).
- The "vleks" worn on each gown are special medals distributed as rewards for exceptional support to the Vla-Vla.
- The ribbon of the Vla-Vla is black, yellow and blue. The members coming from eastern-Flanders wear it with the black part upwards. The members coming from western-flanders wear it with the blue part upwards.(Codex Art.61) .
- The committee's responsible for each year's newcomers wears two bands at the same time.
- Committee members wear a much wider band than the others.

== Official anthem ==
The "Minuit Vla-Vla" is only sung at midnight during gatherings between members.

"Minuit Vla-Vla, c'est l'heure solennelle

Où la roulade descendit jusqu'à nous

Pour effacer la tache manchabalienne, et des pandours exciter le courroux

Le monde entier tressaille d'allégresse, sous les clameurs d'une folle jeunesse

Peuple à genoux, c'est la Vla-Vla qui passe!

Buvez! Roulez! Voici la réaction! (Bis)"
