= Gilding =

Covering an object with a layer of gold

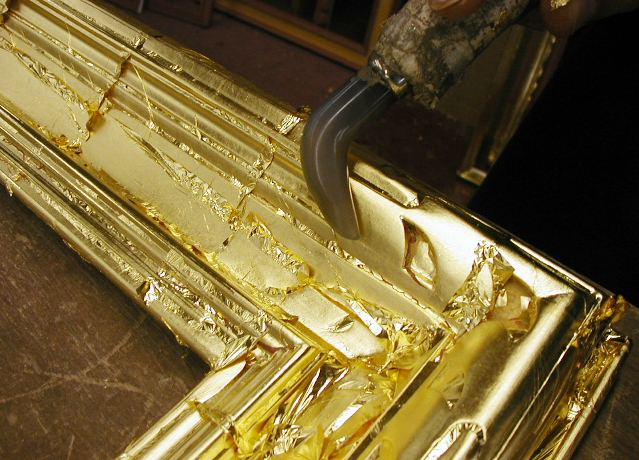
Gilded frame ready for burnishing with an agate stone tool

Application of gold leaf to a reproduction of a 15th-century panel painting

Gilding is a decorative technique for applying a very thin coating of gold over solid surfaces such as metal (most common), wood, porcelain, or stone. A gilded object is also described as "gilt". Where metal is gilded, the metal below was traditionally silver in the West, to make silver-gilt (or vermeil) objects, but gilt-bronze is commonly used in China, and also called ormolu if it is Western. Methods of gilding include hand application and gluing, typically of gold leaf, chemical gilding, and electroplating, the last also called gold plating. Parcel-gilt (partial gilt) objects are only gilded over part of their surfaces. This may mean that all of the inside, and none of the outside, of a chalice or similar vessel is gilded, or that patterns or images are made up by using a combination of gilt and ungilted areas.

Gilding gives an object a gold appearance at a fraction of the cost of creating a solid gold object. In addition, a solid gold piece would often be too soft or too heavy for practical use. A gilt surface also does not tarnish as silver does.

Modern gilding is applied to numerous and diverse surfaces and by various processes. (Note: For the techniques used in modern technology, see gold plating.) More traditional techniques still form an important part of framemaking and are sometimes still employed in general woodworking, cabinet-work, decorative painting and interior decoration, bookbinding, and ornamental leather work, and in the decoration of pottery, porcelain, and glass.

== History ==
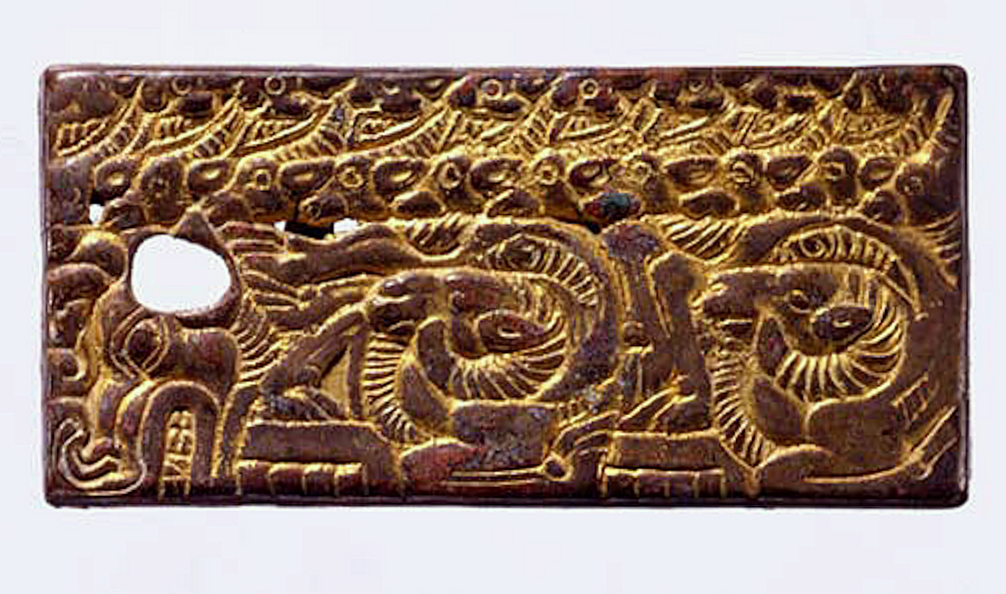
Belt Buckle with nomadic-inspired zoomorphic design, manufactured in China for the Xiongnu. Mercury-gilded bronze (a Chinese technique invented by the Daoists in the 4th century CE). North China, 3rd–2nd century BC.

Herodotus mentions that the Egyptians gilded wood and metals, and many such objects have been excavated. Certain Ancient Greek statues of great prestige were chryselephantine, i.e., made of gold (for the clothing) and ivory (for the flesh); these however, were constructed with sheets of gold over a timber framework, not gilded. Extensive ornamental gilding was also used in the ceiling coffers of the Propylaea.

Pliny the Elder recorded that the first gilding seen at Rome was after the destruction of Carthage, under the censorship of Lucius Mummius, when the Romans began to gild the ceilings of their temples and palaces, the Capitol being the first place where this process was used. Gilding became a popular luxury within Rome soon after the introduction of the technique, with gilding soon being seen used on the walls, vaults and inside the houses of anyone who could afford it, including the poor. Owing to the comparative thickness of the gold leaf used in ancient gilding, the traces of it that remain are remarkably brilliant and solid. Fire-gilding of metal goes back at least to the 4th century BC. Mercury-gilding was invented by Chinese Daoists in the 4th century CE and was used for the gilding of bronze plaques. It was known to Pliny (33,20,64–5), Vitruvius (8,8,4) and in the early medieval period to Theophilus (De Diversis Artibus Book III).

In Europe, silver-gilt has always been more common than gilt-bronze, but in China the opposite has been the case. The ancient Chinese also developed the gilding of porcelain, which was later taken up by the French and other European potters.

== Mechanical gilding ==
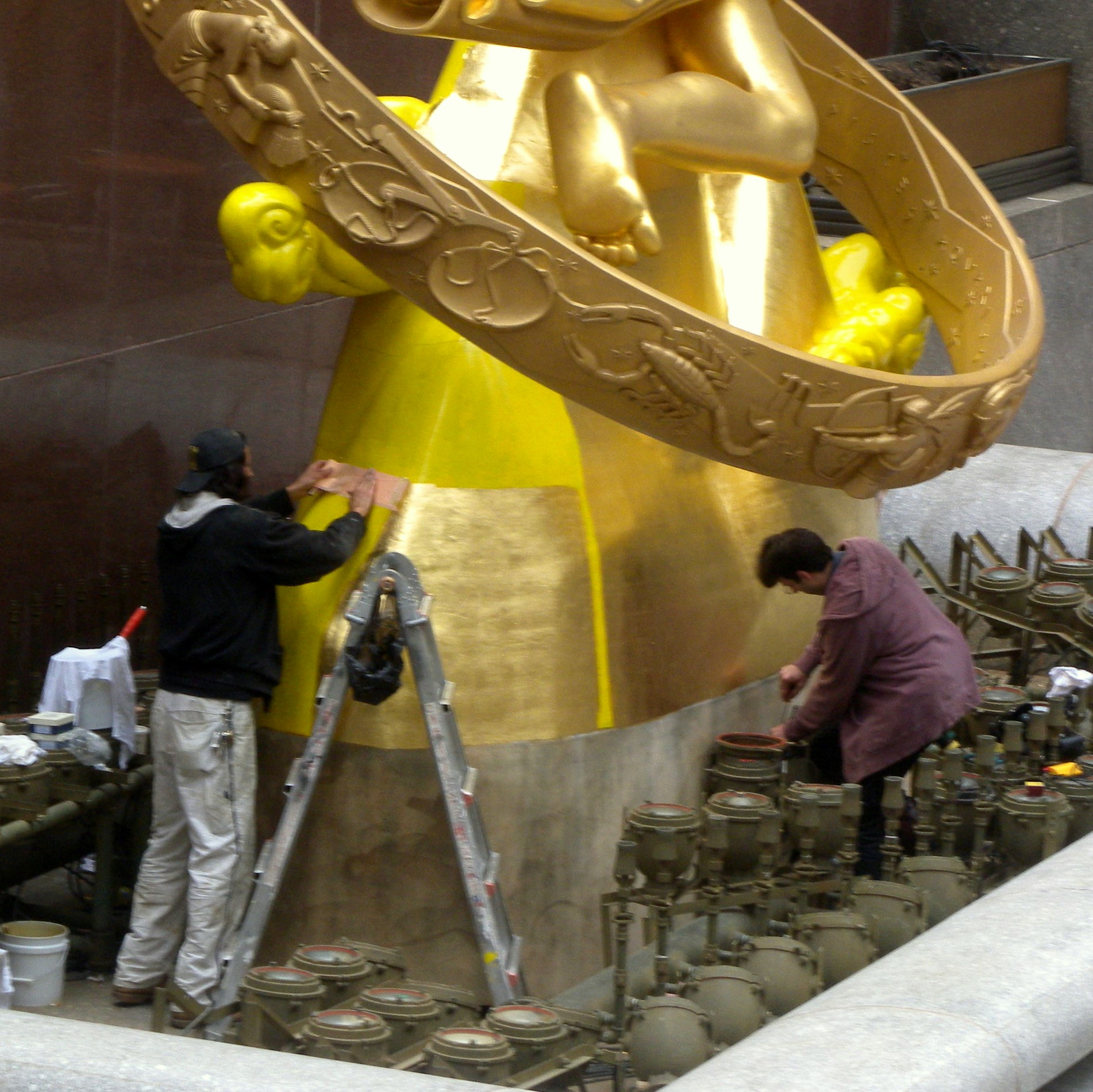
Regilding the statue Prometheus

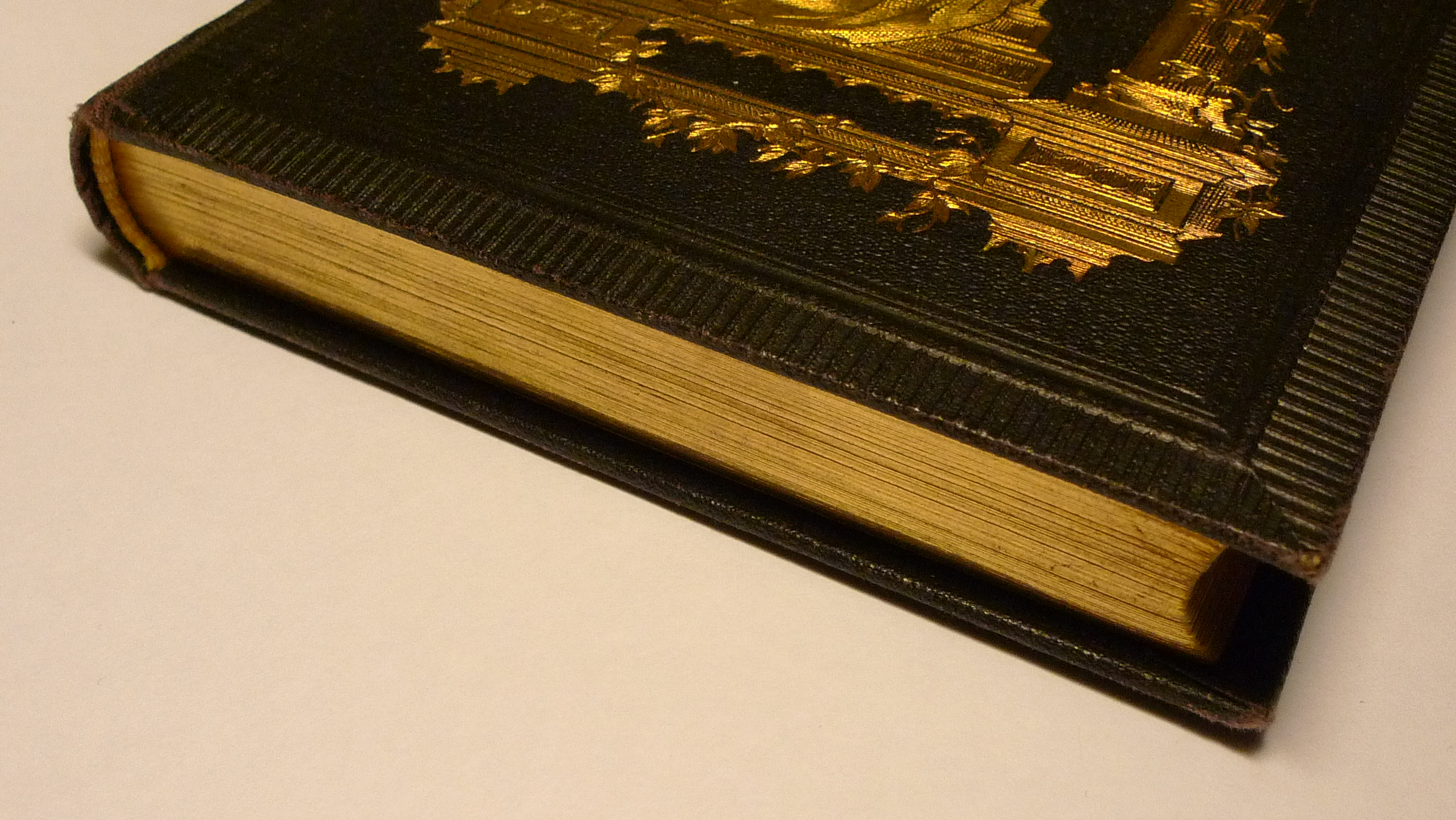
Gilded page edges on a book

Mechanical gilding includes all the operations in which gold leaf is prepared, and the processes to mechanically attach the gold onto surfaces. The techniques include burnishing, water gilding and oil-gilding used by wood carvers and gilders; and the gilding operations of the house decorator, sign painter, bookbinder, the paper stainer and several others.

Polished iron, steel and other metals are gilded mechanically by applying gold leaf to the metallic surface at a temperature just under red-hot, pressing the leaf on with a burnisher, then reheating when additional leaf may be laid on. The process is completed by cold burnishing.

"Overlaying" or folding or hammering on gold foil or gold leaf is the simplest and most ancient method, and is mentioned in Homer's Odyssey and the Old Testament. The Ram in a Thicket (2600–2400 BC) from Ur describes this technique used on wood, with a thin layer of bitumen underneath to help adhesion.

The next advances involved two simple processes. The first involves gold leaf, which is gold that is hammered or cut into very thin sheets. Gold leaf is often thinner than standard paper today, and when held to the light is semi-transparent. In ancient times it was typically about ten times thicker than today, and perhaps half that in the Middle Ages.

If gilding on canvas or on wood, the surface was often first coated with gesso. "Gesso" is a substance made of finely ground gypsum or chalk mixed with glue. Once the coating of gesso had been applied, allowed to dry, and smoothed, it was re-wet with a sizing made of rabbit-skin glue and water ("water gilding", which allows the surface to be subsequently burnished to a mirror-like finish) or boiled linseed oil mixed with litharge ("oil gilding", which does not) and the gold leaf was layered on using a gilder's tip and left to dry before being burnished with a piece of polished agate. Those gilding on canvas and parchment also sometimes employed stiffly-beaten egg whites ("glair"), gum, and/or Armenian bole as sizing, though egg whites and gum both become brittle over time, causing the gold leaf to crack and detach, and so honey was sometimes added to make them more flexible.

Other gilding processes involved using the gold as pigment in paint: the artist ground the gold into a fine powder and mixed it with a binder such as gum arabic. The resulting gold paint, called shell gold, was applied in the same way as with any paint. Sometimes, after either gold-leafing or gold-painting, the artist would heat the piece enough to melt the gold slightly, ensuring an even coat. These techniques remained the only alternatives for materials like wood, leather, the vellum pages of illuminated manuscripts, and gilt-edged stock.

== Chemical gilding ==
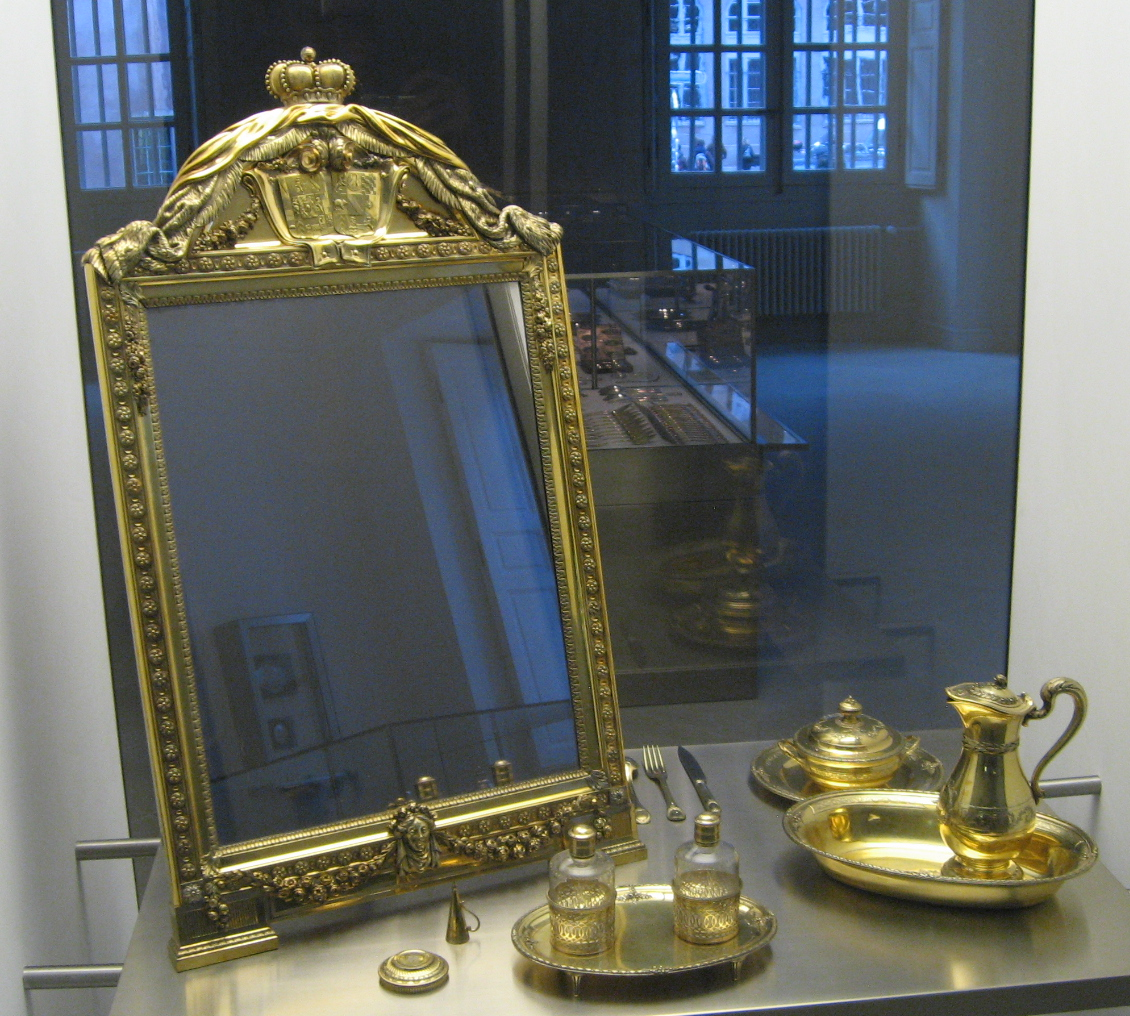
Silver gilt toilette set by Johann Jacob Kirstein (1733–1816) in the Musée des Arts décoratifs, Strasbourg

Chemical gilding embraces those processes in which the gold is at some stage of chemical combination. These include cold gilding, wet gilding, fire gilding and depletion gilding.

=== Cold gilding ===
In cold gilding, the gilder uses extremely fine gold (i.e. atomized or finely powdered), and applies it to a surface. Cold gilding on silver is performed by a solution of gold in aqua regia, applied by dipping a linen rag into the solution, burning it, and rubbing the black and heavy ashes on the silver with the finger or a piece of leather or cork.

=== Wet gilding ===
Wet gilding is effected by means of a dilute solution of gold(III) chloride in aqua regia with twice its quantity of ether. The liquids are agitated and allowed to rest, to allow the ether to separate and float on the surface of the acid. The whole mixture is then poured into a separating funnel with a small aperture, and allowed to rest for some time, when the acid is run off from below and the gold dissolved in ether separated. The ether will be found to have taken up all the gold from the acid, and may be used for gilding iron or steel, for which purpose the metal is polished with fine emery and spirits of wine. The ether is then applied with a small brush, and as it evaporates it deposits the gold, which can now be heated and polished. For small delicate figures, a pen or a fine brush may be used for laying on the ether solution. The gold(III) chloride can also be dissolved in water in electroless plating wherein the gold is slowly reduced out of solution onto the surface to be gilded. When this technique is used on the second surface of glass and backed with silver, it is known as "Angel gilding".

=== Fire gilding ===
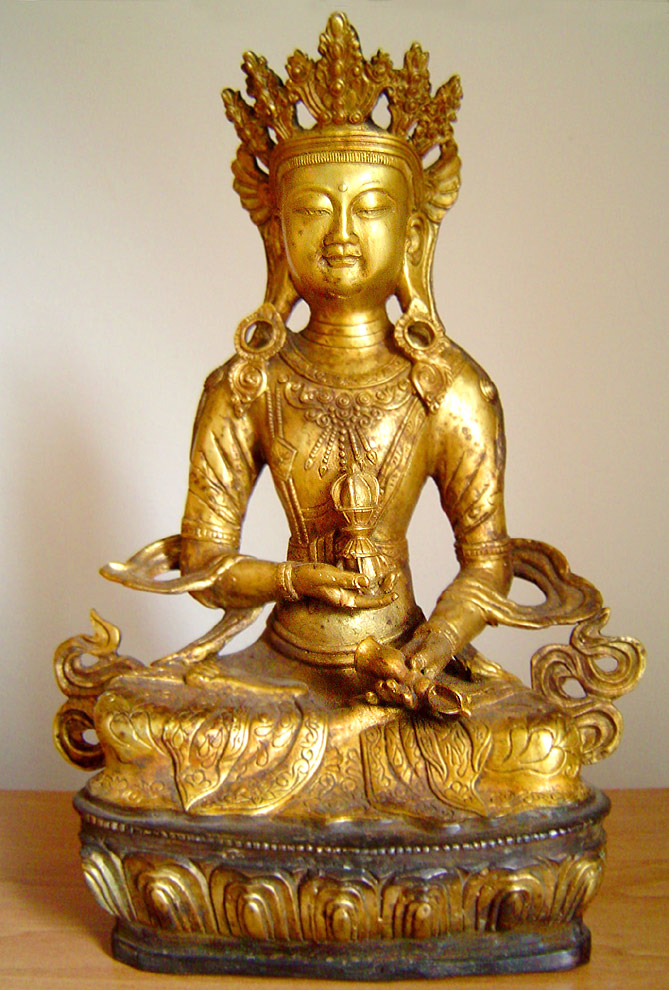
A gilded Tibetan Vajrasattva

Fire-gilding or wash-gilding is a process by which an amalgam of gold is applied to metallic surfaces, the mercury being subsequently volatilized, leaving a film of gold or an amalgam containing 13 to 16% mercury. In the preparation of the amalgam, the gold must first be reduced to thin plates or grains, which are heated red-hot, and thrown into previously heated mercury, until it begins to smoke. When the mixture is stirred with an iron rod, the gold is totally absorbed. The proportion of mercury to gold is generally six or eight to one. When the amalgam is cold, it is squeezed through chamois leather to separate the superfluous mercury; the gold, with about twice its weight of mercury, remains behind, forming a yellowish silvery mass with the consistency of butter.

When the metal to be gilded is wrought or chased, the application of mercury before the amalgam is applied allows for it to be more easily spread. When the surface of the metal is plain, the amalgam can be applied to it directly. When no such preparation is applied, the surface to be gilded is simply bitten and cleaned with nitric acid. A deposit of mercury is obtained on a metallic surface by means of quicksilver water, a solution of mercury(II) nitrate, the nitric acid attacking the metal to which it is applied, and thus leaving a film of free metallic mercury.

After the amalgam is equally spread over the prepared surface of the metal, the mercury is then carefully volatilized with heat just sufficient to do so, as a temperature too high may cause part of the gold to be driven off, or otherwise run together, leaving some of the metal surface bare.

When the mercury has evaporated, indicated by the surface taking on a dull yellow color, the metal must undergo further steps to exhibit its fine gold color. First, the gilded surface is rubbed with a scratch brush of brass wire, until its surface is smooth. It is then covered with gilding wax, and again exposed to fire until the wax is burnt off. Gilding wax is composed of beeswax mixed with some of the following substances: red ochre, verdigris, copper scales, alum, vitriol, and borax. By this operation the color of the gilding is heightened, as a result of the perfect dissipation of some of the remaining mercury. The gilt surface is then covered over with potassium nitrate, alum or other salts, ground together, and mixed into a paste with water or weak ammonia. The piece of metal is then exposed to heat, before being quenched in water.

By this method, the color of the gilding is further improved and brought nearer to that of gold, probably by removing any particles of copper that may have been on the gilt surface. This process, when skillfully carried out, produces gilding of great solidity and beauty. This method of gilding metallic objects was formerly widespread, but fell into disuse as the dangers of mercury toxicity became known. Since fire-gilding requires that the mercury be volatilized to drive off the mercury and leave the gold behind on the surface, it is extremely dangerous. Breathing the fumes generated by this process can quickly result in serious health problems, such as neurological damage and endocrine disorders, since inhalation is a very efficient route for mercuric compounds to enter the body; the mercury used in the process also evaporates into the atmosphere, thus polluting it. This process has generally been supplanted by the electroplating of gold over a nickel substrate, which is more economical and less dangerous.

=== Depletion ===
In depletion gilding, a subtractive process discovered in pre-Columbian Mesoamerica, articles are fabricated by various techniques from an alloy of copper and gold, named tumbaga by the Spaniards. The surface is etched with acids, resulting in a surface of porous gold. The porous surface is then burnished down, resulting in a shiny gold surface. The results fooled the conquistadors into thinking they had massive quantities of pure gold. The results startled modern archaeologists, because at first the pieces resemble electroplated articles. Keum-boo is a special Korean technique of silver-gilding, using depletion gilding.

== Bookbinding ==
Gilding in bookbinding generally refers to covering the bookblock (set of pages inside the cover) edges with gold, which is specifically called edge gilding. Edges can be cut flush first for a smooth edge, in which case they are trimmed, sized, gilded, and burnished. In many European binding traditions the edge is prepared with Armenian bole, which shows through the gold, but in 18th century France gilt edges were first marbled. Edges can also be gilded before sewing the book, which creates an edge that is not flush, called a rough gilt edge.

There are some examples of gilt endpapers in European books, where the pastedown and flyleaf are covered solidly in gold leaf.

On the cover, applying gold leaf or foil is called tooling if done with hand tools, or blocking if done by machine. Shell gold can also be used.

== Ceramics ==
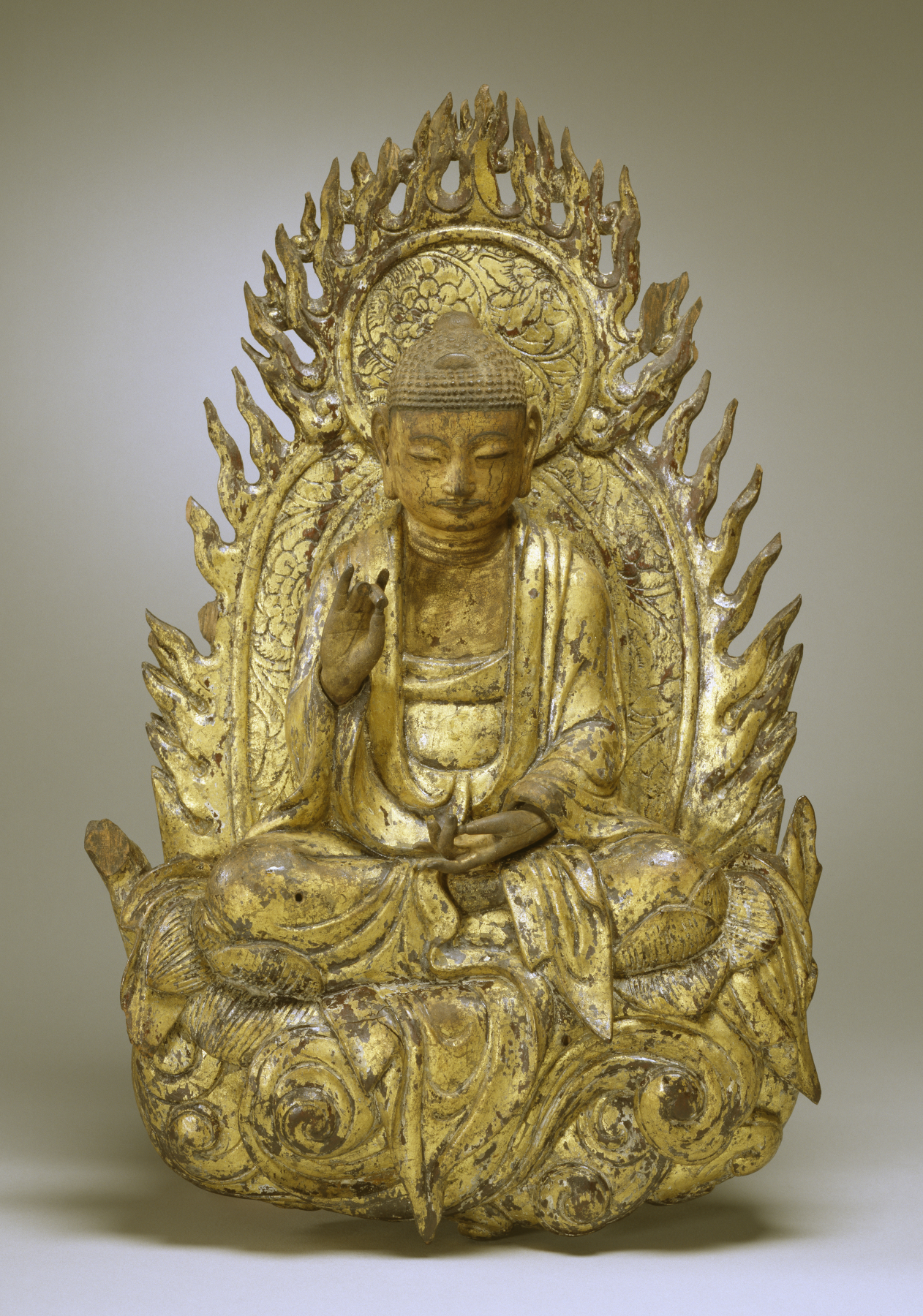
Buddha, 16th century, gilt on wood; The Walters Art Museum.

The gilding of decorative ceramics has been undertaken for centuries, with the permanence and brightness of gold appealing to designers. Both porcelain and earthenware are commonly decorated with gold, and in the late 1970s it was reported that 5 tonnes of gold were used annually for the decoration of these products. Some wall tiles also have gold decoration. Application techniques include spraying, brushing, banding machines, and direct or indirect screen-printing. After application the decorated ware is fired in a kiln to fuse the gold to the glaze and hence ensure its permanence. The most important factors affecting coating quality are the composition of applied gold, the state of the surface before application, the thickness of the layer and the firing conditions.

A number of different forms and compositions are available to apply gold to ceramic, and these include:

- Acid-etched gilding: developed in 1860s at Mintons, Stoke-on-Trent, and patented in 1863. The glazed surface, usually a narrow border, is transfer printed with a wax-like resist, after which the glaze is etched with dilute hydrofluoric acid prior to application of the gold, after which the design's raised elements are selectively burnished to give a bright and matte surface; the process demands great skill and is used for the decoration only of ware of the highest class.
- Bright gold or liquid gold is a solution of gold sulphoresinate together with other metal resinates and a bismuth-based flux. It is particularly bright when drawn from the decorating kiln and so needs little further processing. This form of gilding was invented or at least improved by Heinrich Roessler. Rhodium compounds are used to improve the binding to the substrate.
- Burnish gold or best gold is applied to the ware as a suspension of gold powder in essential oils mixed with lead borosilicate or a bismuth-based flux. This type of gold decoration is dull as taken from the kiln and requires burnishing, usually with agate, to bring out the colour. As the name suggests it is considered the highest quality of gold decoration. One solvent-free burnish gold composition was reported to consist of 10 to 40% gold powder, 2 to 20% polyvinylpyrrolidone, 3 to 30% an aqueous acrylate resin and 5 to 50% water.

== Tools ==
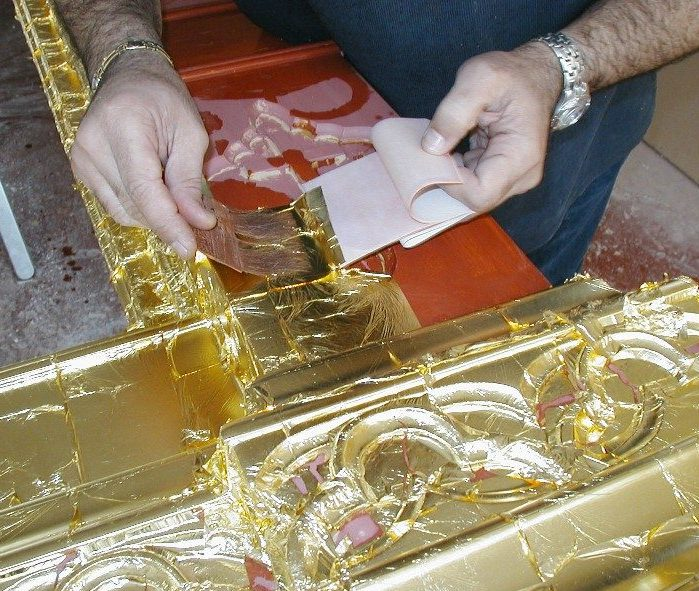
Artist holding a gilder's tip in his right hand and using it to lift a piece of gold leaf from a sheet of paper

A gilder's tip is a type of gilding brush used for transferring sheets of metal leaf to either a surface that has been prepared to accept the leaf or to a gilder's block where the leaf is then cut with a gilder's knife into smaller portions before being transferred to the prepared surface.

The hairs on a gilder's tip are usually made of either blue squirrel hair or the hair of a badger (sometimes other hairs are also used, such as that of a camel) arranged in a single or double row along a flat ferrule made of wood or cardboard. In order to transfer the gold leaf, the hairs are first given a very light coating of adhesive by brushing them against a surface such as the back of the user's hand which has been coated with a thin layer of petroleum jelly (a common misconception is that static electricity causes the gold foil to attach to the brush, but this is not so) and then laying the edge of the brush along the edge of the piece of metal foil. The jelly will cause the metal to adhere very gently to the hairs and allow the piece to be floated from the paper surface on which it had previously been stored. Because the leaf is so thin, this must be done in a room with extremely still air, and the user of the tip usually does not breathe until the leaf is in place.

Once the leaf has settled, it is often burnished with polished piece of agate to achieve a high degree of brilliance.

Gilder's tips are necessary because touching the metal leaf with the finger tips would immediately cause the leaf to lose its coherent, flattened shape and crumble irretrievably into metallic dust which then cannot be used for any purpose.

== See also ==
- French Empire mantel clock
- Gilding metal
- Goldbeating
- Hot stamping
