= Transfer technique (drawing) =

Drawing technique

The transfer technique is a special drawing technique that was developed by the painter and draftsman Jules Pascin. In Pascin’s mind a drawing should be done in complete freedom by the hand that is doing the drawing, without being controlled by the eye. He developed a form of blind contour drawing whereby a sheet of carbon paper was laid between two sheets of paper. The drawing itself was done using a non-writing pen (or stylus).

== The transfer technique as used by Kristians Tonny ==
The Dutch Surrealist artist Kristians Tonny developed his own method of transfer drawing that focused on figures from mythology, inspired by Pablo Picasso's blue period.

Tonny developed on Pascin's technique and replaced the carbon paper with a layer on the basis of oil paint which he applied evenly on the back of the sheet of paper that went on top: The recipe of the oil paint-based mixture enabled him to get an even imprint of his drawing on the sheet of paper below during several hours, so that a large composition could be set up. The mixture also ensured that both finely drawn lines and more robust tracts would show through with equal precision, enabling him to achieve a great multitude of shades and to do very detailed drawing.

Although Kristians Tonny used to contradict this, the transfer technique is often seen as a form of automatic drawing.

== Transfer drawings of Paul Gauguin ==
French Painter Paul Gauguin used a style of transfer drawing to create double-sided artworks when he lived in Tahiti from 1899–1908. For the drawing Eve ('The Nightmare'), Gauguin started by coating a sheet of paper with printers ink, then placing a blank sheet on top which becomes the artwork. Markings made with various drawing instruments to create an artwork on one side of the sheet, also transfer the printers ink to the back side of the sheet. The back side (verso) starts as the inverse or mirror-image of the front, which was further developed with different media as a separate drawing. Transfer drawings in a series entitled Tahitian Woman with Evil Spirit (c. 1900) were exhibited with other work by the artist at the Museum of Modern Art from March 8 through June 8, 2014.
