= De Kring =

Dutch artists organisation

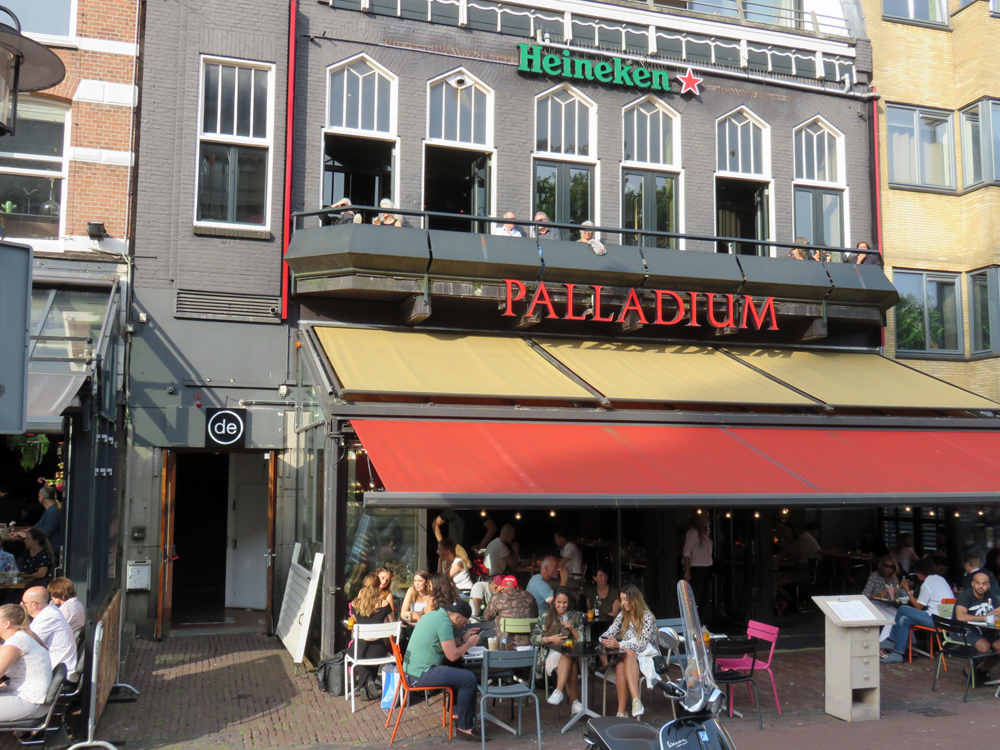
- Building at Kleine-Gartmanplantsoen 7–9 in Amsterdam, which houses a bar on the ground floor, and on the first floor the artist's association De Kring
- Formation: September 23, 1922 (age 104)
- Type: Artists Society
- Members: 1900
- Website: Official website

Artists Society De Kring was founded on September 23, 1922, by artists and intellectuals who looked for a home away from home in Amsterdam.

De Kring is a private club and becoming a member takes place by means of ballot.
