= Anna Park =

Anna Park may refer to:

- Anna Park (Robert Burns) (1769–1791), Scottish woman who bore the poet Robert Burns an illegitimate child named Elizabeth 'Betty' Burns
- Anna Park (artist) (born 1996), Korean-American visual artist

== See also ==
- Annie Park (born 1995), American golfer
