= Subtractive drawing =

Drawing technique using charcoal or graphite, then getting erased

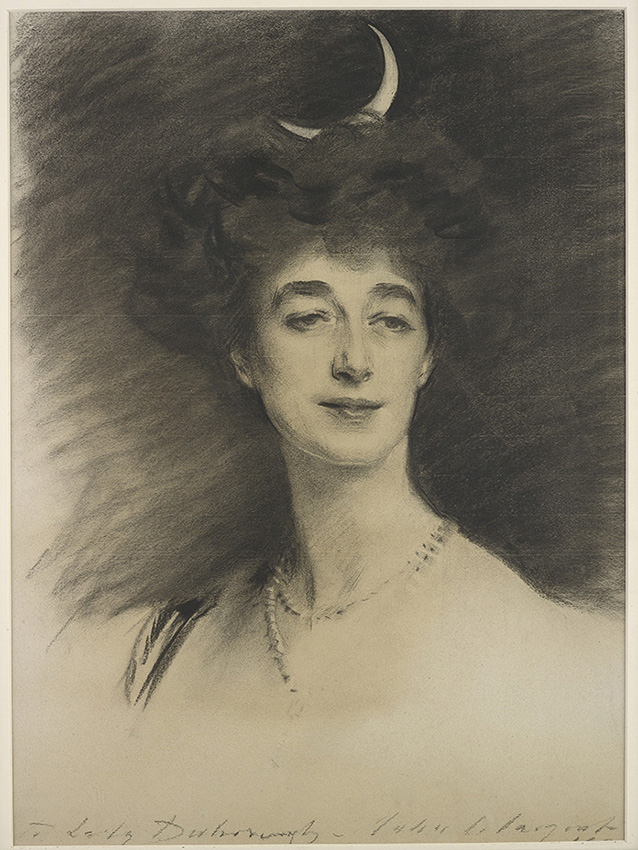
215x215pxA charcoal portrait of Ethel Grenfell by John Singer Sargent, drawn with a combination of subtractive and additive techniques.

Subtractive drawing is a technique in which the drawing surface is covered with graphite or charcoal marks and then erased to make the image. This technique is often used to add texture, establish tonal shapes, or create the appearance of reflected light in a drawing. Artists commonly use a kneaded or putty eraser for this type of drawing, due to its ability to absorb pigment and be manipulated into custom shapes, including fine tips. Charcoal figure drawing commonly uses a combination of subtractive and additive drawing techniques.
