= Negro (lead pencil) =

Negro is the name of an artist's drawing medium, consisting of black pencil lead often encased in a wooden or paper tool. Its history and uses are common knowledge among illustrators and historians interested in illustrative art. The word "Negro", translates to "black" in Spanish and Italian, and is a term commonly used to describe artists' media and pigments that are black or dark in color.

== History ==
Negro lead was originally composed of a mixture of wax and charcoal and was often used in combination with heavily textured coquille paper. The intention was to create sturdy pencil line art which was dark enough to be reproduced with early photographic technology. It was used as a replacement for lithographic printmaking, just as pen and ink line art essentially took the place of intaglio in late 19th-century illustration.

While the name is used in the artistic sense, referring to the literal shade of the pencil, stylized depictions of Black Africans have been used in marketing campaigns and product packaging.

One of the original producers of negro pencils was the Koh-i-Noor company; however, those manufactured by the company today are composed of lead that is slightly less dark and waxy than the originals. Cretacolor produces what they call Nero pencils, which are similar in composition. Prismacolor also manufactures a lead-based black pencil that is very close in composition.
