= Fixative (drawing) =

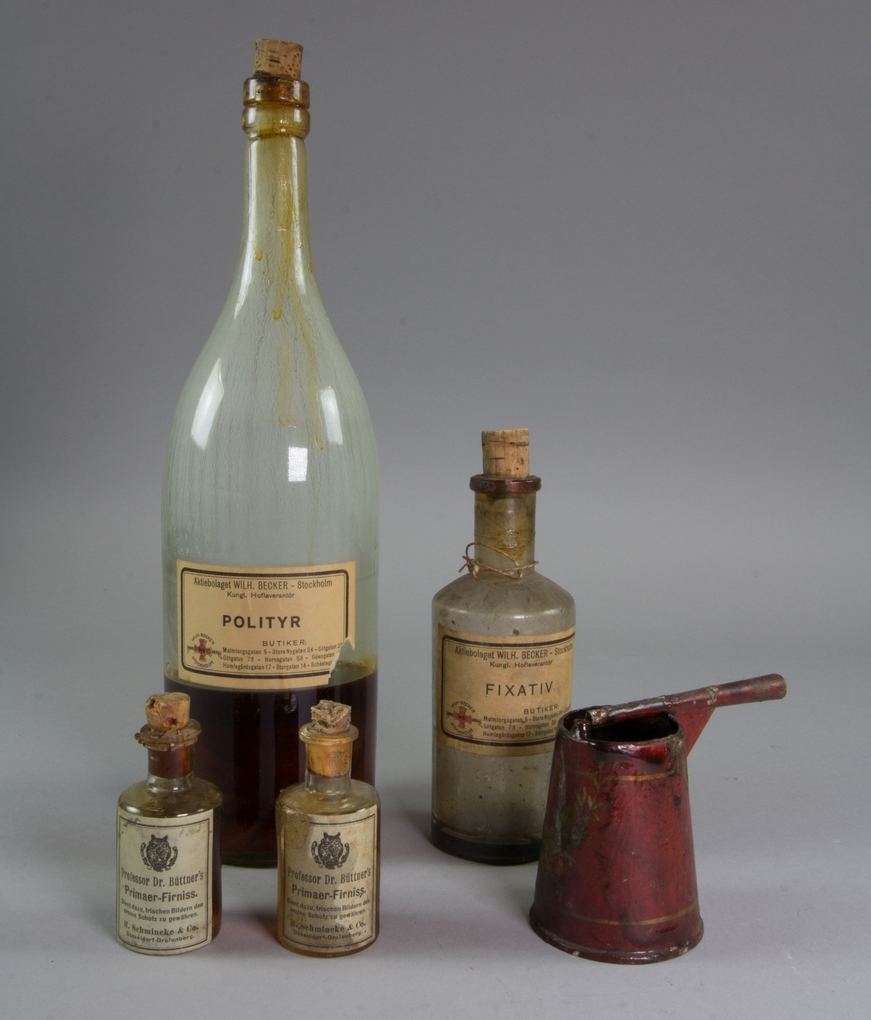
Fixative, polish, varnish and a fixative sprayer from c. 1880-1920, belonging to Julius Kronberg.

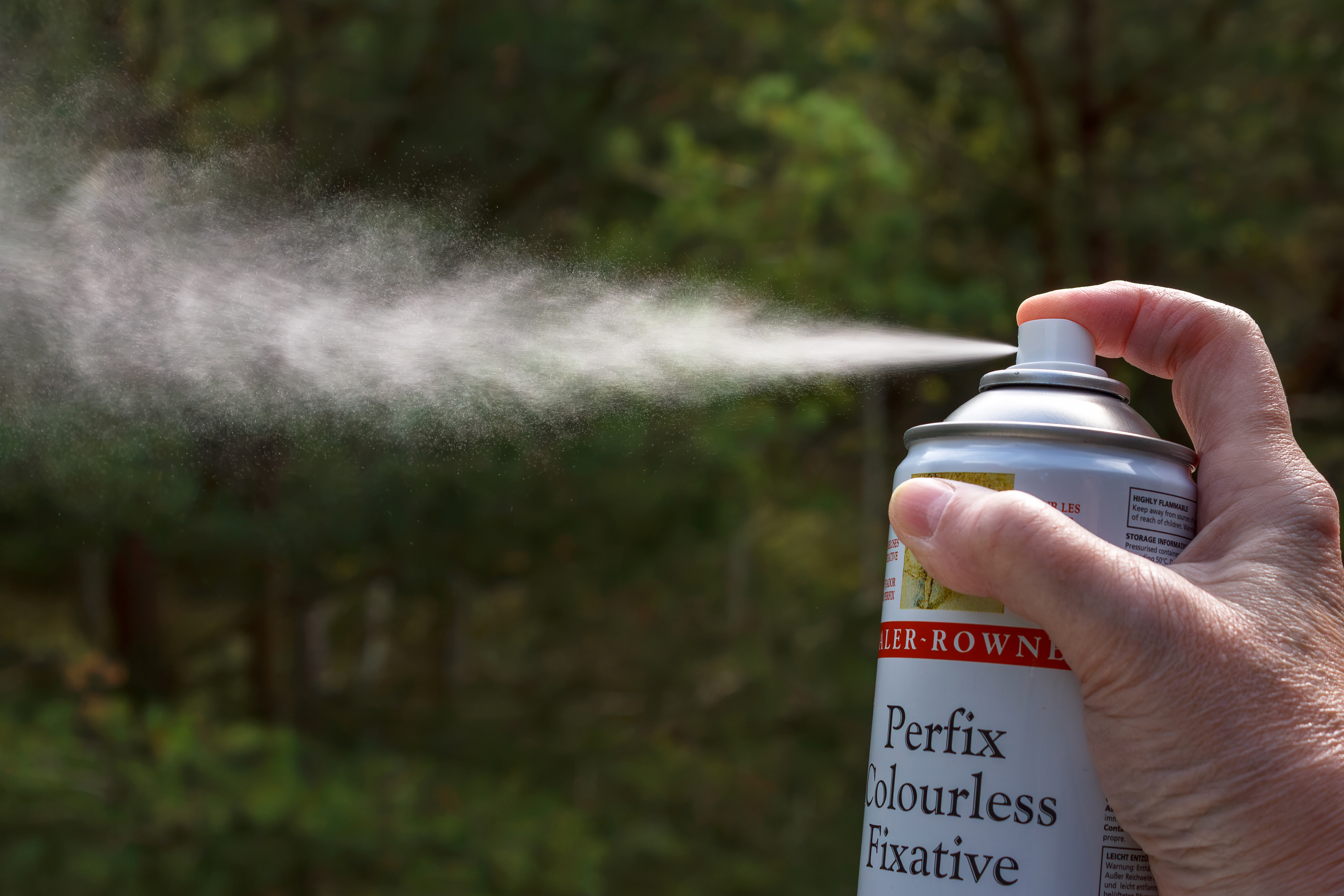
Modern fixative in a spray can.

In art, in particular drawings in pastels, charcoal, chalk, and other dry media, a fixative is a kind of preserving agent applied over the top of the drawing to prevent crumbling, smudging, fading, and discolouring. In times gone by, natural substances such as diluted egg white were painted on, but today synthetic sprays are usually used. However some artists, such as the Aboriginal Australian artists at Warmun, Western Australia, use traditional substances, in this case gum gathered from local bloodwood trees.

Fixative is similar to varnish, but there are some key differences. Varnish is often used to protect paintings from atmospheric moisture, sunlight and dust; it helps to protect from being scratched, and makes the colours brighter. Fixatives prevents smearing.

Fixatives are usually made from casein, synthetic resin or glue.
