= Anna Park (artist) =

American artist (born 1996)

- Born: 1996 (age 29–30); South Korea
- Education: New York Academy of Art
- Known for: Charcoal Drawing

Anna Park (born 1996) is a South Korean-born American contemporary artist based in Brooklyn, New York, recognized for her dynamic, large-scale charcoal drawings that explore themes of chaos, identity, and the complexities of human interaction. Raised in Salt Lake City, Utah, after immigrating to the United States at a young age, Park’s early experiences with cultural transition have influenced her artistic focus on adaptation, individuality, and the tension between self and society. Her mother, a pharmacist, encouraged her artistic interests by enrolling her in after-school art classes. Park earned her MFA and Certificate of Fine Arts from the New York Academy of Art, having previously studied at Pratt Institute in Brooklyn. Park gained significant recognition in 2019 when the artist KAWS discovered her work at the New York Academy of Art's open studio exhibition and promoted it on social media, leading to greater public attention and acclaim. Her practice encompasses both painting and drawing, though she is particularly known for her expressive use of charcoal. Her work draws on twentieth-century Expressionism, the gestural mark-making of Abstract Expressionists such as Franz Kline, comic book art, and the layered imagery of contemporary visual culture. Her compositions often depict chaotic gatherings and emotionally charged social situations, using overlapping, distorted figures and fragmented narratives as metaphors for the unpredictability and turbulence of modern existence. The influence of mass media, cartoons, and pop culture is evident in her exaggerated expressions and surreal scenarios, which interrogate how media shapes perception and blurs the boundary between reality and fiction.Park’s technique involves layering rapid, gestural charcoal marks with careful erasures to build movement, tonal depth, and psychological complexity.She often works both upright at an easel and flat on the floor, allowing her to combine sweeping gestures with finely rendered details. Despite the intensity of her scenes, Park frequently incorporates humor and absurdity, encouraging reflection on the conventions and contradictions of social behavior.

== Early life and education ==
Anna Park was born in South Korea in 1996 and moved to the United States with her family at a young age. After a brief period in California, her family settled in Salt Lake City, Utah. Her mother, a pharmacist, supported her early artistic development by enrolling her in after-school art classes. Park’s experience adapting to a new cultural environment has informed recurring themes of identity, transition, and emotional intensity in her work.

She later attended Pratt Institute in Brooklyn before transferring to the New York Academy of Art, where she earned both a Master of Fine Arts degree and a Certificate of Fine Arts.

== Artistic Practice ==
Anna Park’s practice spans both painting and charcoal drawing, though she is best known for her large-scale charcoal compositions.7 Her work draws inspiration from twentieth-century Expressionism, Abstract Expressionism—particularly Franz Kline's gestural style—and comic book imagery, as well as the layered visual language of contemporary media culture.

Her compositions occupy a space between figuration and abstraction, often portraying chaotic, densely populated scenes that explore emotional extremes such as joy and despair, excess and celebration, and life and death. These works reflect the frenetic energy of the information age, capturing the psychological complexity of contemporary life.

In 2019, while attending graduate school, Park caught KAWS's attention at a New York Academy of Art event. After he shared her work on social media, her visibility increased significantly, leading to broader recognition. Critics have emphasized the energy, technical precision, and psychological depth of her work, noting her ability to merge humor with complex emotional and social commentary.

Park’s technique centers on charcoal as a primary medium. She builds compositions through layered, gestural marks combined with strategic erasure, producing both dynamic movement and subtle tonal variation. 15, 16 Her process allows for both expansive gestures and intricate detail, contributing to the distinctive intensity of her large-scale works.

=== Exhibitions and collections ===
Her work has been included in numerous exhibitions. In 2019, she participated in 100 Drawings from Now at The Drawing Center in New York. Her first European solo exhibition was held at T293 Gallery in Rome, and she has since presented solo exhibitions in Los Angeles, New York, and Tokyo. She has also participated in group exhibitions at institutions such as the Los Angeles County Museum of Art and The Aldrich Contemporary Art Museum.

In 2023, the SCAD Museum of Art in Savannah, Georgia, presented Last Call, a major solo exhibition of her work. The exhibition expanded on her signature charcoal compositions, focusing on tonal variations of black, gray, and white. Notable works from 2021, including Now You See Me, Last Call, and Free Fall, were featured.

== Awards and recognition ==
Anna Park received the First Prize in the AXA Art Prize in 2019 and the Grand Prize in Strokes of Genius 11: Discovering Beauty, also in 2019. Critics and curators have consistently highlighted the energy, technical virtuosity, and psychological depth of her work, as well as her ability to integrate humor and commentary on contemporary media culture within complex, crowded compositions.
