= Kneaded eraser =

Type of eraser

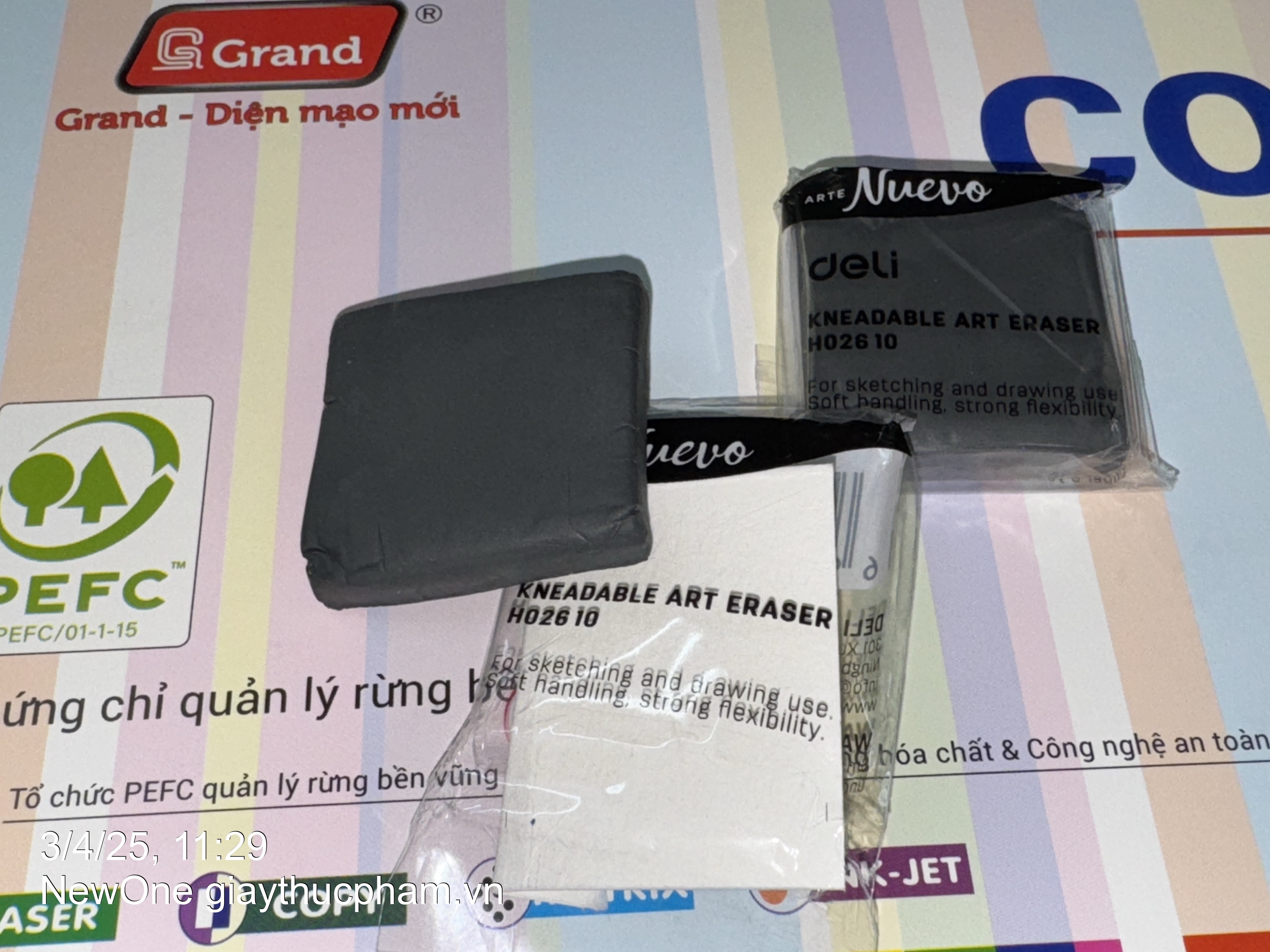
Two newly purchased kneaded erasers

A kneaded eraser, also known as a putty rubber, is a pliable erasing tool used by artists. It is usually made of unvulcanized rubber, typically gray or white, resembling putty or chewing gum. It functions by absorbing graphite and charcoal particles, in addition to carbon, colored pencil, or pastel marks. It neither wears nor leaves residue ("eraser crumbs"), but it collects graphite and dust more easily, leading to it being more prone to getting darker. Typically, a kneaded eraser lasts for less time than a regular eraser before being discarded. However, it can last forever if maintained by washing and kneading.

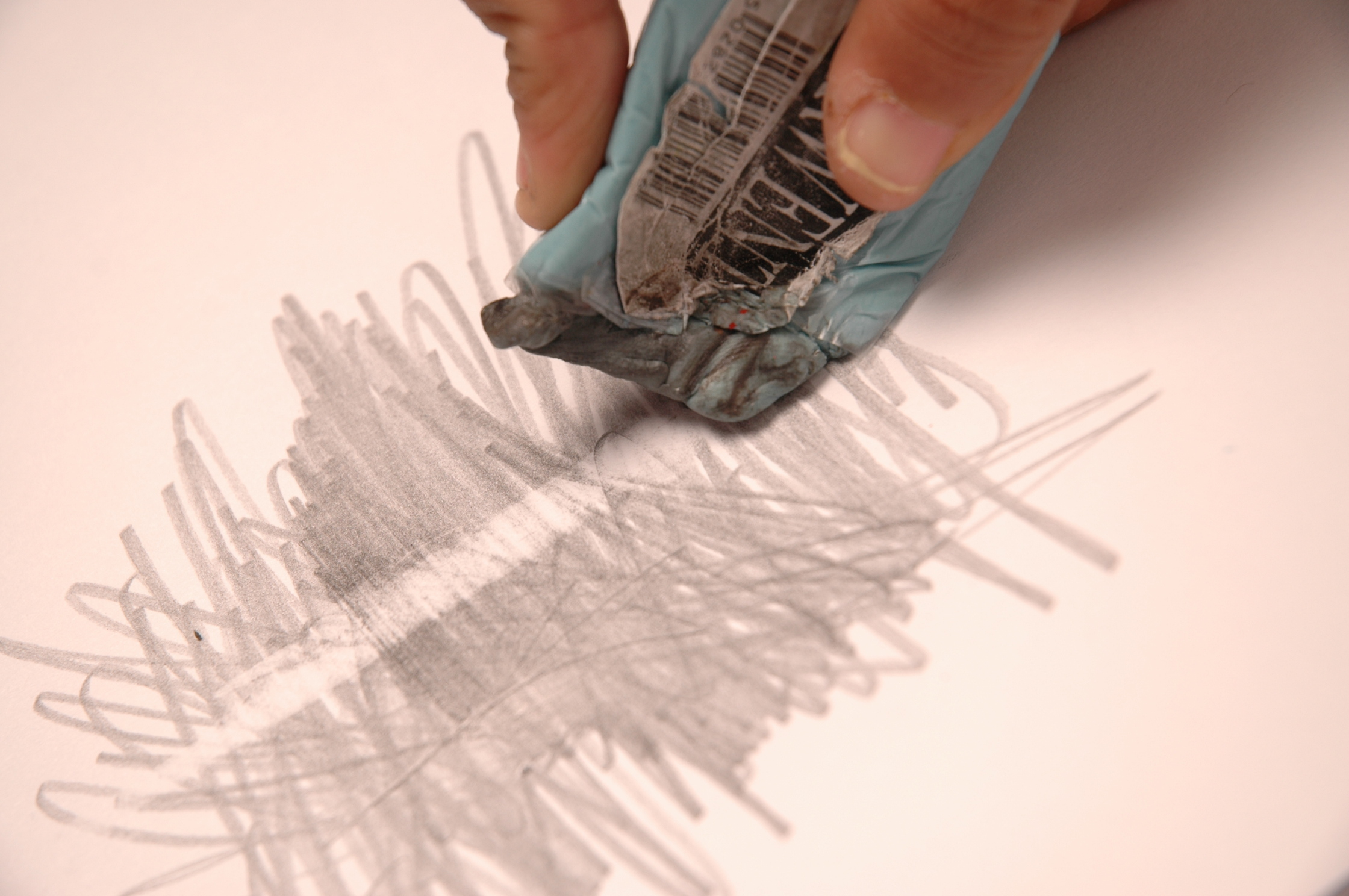
A kneaded eraser is used to remove thin details

Kneaded erasers have high plasticity and can be stretched, compressed, split, and molded for precision erasing, pruning lines, cleaning edges, creating highlights through subtractive drawing, or performing other detail work. They can completely remove light marks, but are ill-suited to fully erasing dark areas. They may also smear or stick if too warm, and can fall apart when stretched.

In addition to their precision, kneaded erasers are preferred by artists for their long life and ease of cleaning. One simply kneads the eraser and the medium will fade into its mass. Although kneaded erasers do not wear away like other erasers, they can become saturated and unable to absorb any more graphite or charcoal. In this case, the eraser will leave marks on the paper instead of removing them. The saturating material can be removed by rinsing thoroughly with water and kneading.
