= Outline of drawing and drawings =

Visual artworks on two-dimensional surfaces

The following outline is provided as an overview of and typical guide to drawing and drawings:

Drawing is a visual art that uses an instrument to mark paper or another two-dimensional surface, or a digital representation of such. Traditionally, the instruments used to create a drawing include pencils, crayons, Conté crayons, and ink pens, sometimes in combination. More modern tools include styluses, mice and graphics tablets, and gamepads in virtual reality drawing software.

A drawing is a product of that activity.

== What types of things are drawing and drawings? ==
- Drawing is a type of:
  - Activity – something someone does
  - Art – an art, one of the arts, is a creative endeavor or discipline.
    - Visual art –
  - Avocation –
  - Vocation –
- A drawing is a type of:
  - Art –
    - Work of art –
      - Illustration –

== Types of drawing and drawings ==
- Academy figure –
- Caricature – pictorial representation of someone in which distinguishing features are exaggerated for comic effect.
- Comics –
- Fashion illustration –
- Figure drawing –
- Gesture drawing –
- Hand-drawn animation –
- Portrait –
- Scratchboard –
- Silhouette –
- Silverpoint –
- Sketch –
  - Courtroom sketch –
  - Croquis –
  - Doodle –
  - Multi-Sketch –
  - Study –
  - Scribble –
- Stick figure –
- Technical drawing/technical illustration –
  - Architectural drawing –
  - Electrical drawing –
  - Engineering drawing –
  - Plumbing drawing –
  - Structural drawing –
  - Scientific illustration (in natural sciences, also referred to biologic, zoologic, or botanical illustration)
  - Mechanical systems drawing–
  - Working drawing–
  - Archaeological illustration–

=== Drawing techniques ===
- Automatic drawing –
- Blind contour drawing – this action is performed were the artist looks at the object and does not look at the canvas or sketch pad
- Contour drawing –
- Chiaroscuro – using strong contrasts between light and dark to achieve a sense of volume in modeling three-dimensional objects such as the human body.
- Gesture Drawing - loose drawing or sketching with the wrists moving, to create a sense of naturalism of the line or shape, as opposed to geometric or mechanical drawing
- Grisaille –
- Hatching – consists of hatching, contour hatching, and double contour hatching
- Masking –
- Mass drawing –
- Screentone –
- Scribble –
- Stippling – using tiny dots that become closer to create darker values, and gradually further away to create lighter values
- Trois crayons – using three colors, typically black, white and sanguine chalks
- Drybrush –

== Types of draughtsman ==
Draughtsman or draftsman –

- Cartoonist –
- Drafter –

== Drawing media and equipment ==
A medium (plural: media) is a material used by an artist to create a work.

=== Common drawing types ===
- Pastel –
  - Oil pastel –
- Charcoal –
- Colored pencil –
- Conté –
- Crayon –
- Graphite – can be pencils which are small or large sticks similar to charcoal
- Marker –
- Pen and Ink –
  - India ink –
  - Technical pen –
- Sanguine –
- Pencil

=== Common bases for drawing ===
- Canvas –
- Paper – most common base for drawing.
  - Sketchbook –
  - Tracing paper –
- Plaster –
- Metal –
- Walls – typically for murals.
- Wood –

=== Other drawing equipment ===
- Compass –
- Eraser –
  - Kneaded eraser –
- Drawing board –
- Fixative –
- French curve –
- Protractor –
- Ruler –
  - Rolling ruler –
- Stencil –
- Stump –

== Principles and elements of drawing ==
- Composition –
- Elements of art – group of aspects of a work of art used in teaching and analysis, in combination with the principles of art. They are texture, form, line, color, value, and shape.
- Perspective – the principle of creating the illusion of 3-dimensionality on a 2-dimensional source such as paper. This is achieved by using one or more vanishing points (Line perspective), or making the atmosphere greyer, blurrier and smaller as it goes further back (Atmospheric perspective).
- Principles of art – set of guidelines of art to be considered concerning the impact of a piece of artwork, in combination with the elements of art. They are movement, unity, harmony, variety, balance, emphasis, contrast, proportion, and pattern.

== Drawing education ==
- Atelier –
- Art school –
- Life class – Observational drawing from a real life model, usually a nude model.
- Magnet Art school programs -

== Awards ==
- Payout Jerwood Drawing Prize –

== Organizations ==
- Association of American Editorial Cartoonists
- Cartoonists Rights Network, International
- Centre for Recent Drawing
- Drawing Center
- National Cartoonists Society
- Royal Drawing Society
- Seattle Cartoonists' Club

== History of drawing ==
- Lineography –
- Plumbago drawing –

=== Some notable draftsmen and drawings ===
- Leonardo da Vinci (1452–1519) – Focus' on human anatomy and life forms.
  - Vitruvian Man (c. 1487) –
- Albrecht Dürer (1471–1528) –
  - Betende Hände ("Praying Hands", c. 1508) –
- Michelangelo (1475–1564) –
  - Epifania –
- Hans Holbein the Younger (c. 1498 – 1543) –
- Peter Paul Rubens (1577–1640) –
  - Isabella Brant (c. 1621) –
- Jean de Beaugrand (1584–1640) –
- Aubrey Beardsley –
- Jacques-Louis David –
- Pierre-Paul Prud'hon –
- Edgar Degas –
- Théodore Géricault –
- Francisco Goya –
- Jean Ingres –
- Odilon Redon –
- Henri de Toulouse-Lautrec –
- Honoré Daumier –
- Vincent van Gogh –
- Käthe Kollwitz –
- Max Beckmann –
- Jean Dubuffet –
- Egon Schiele –
- Arshile Gorky –
- Paul Klee –
- Oscar Kokoschka –
- Alphonse Mucha –
- Gustave Doré (1832–1883)
- Edward Linley Sambourne (1844–1910) –
  - The Rhodes Colossus (1892) –
- M. C. Escher (1898–1972) –
  - Metamorphosis I (1937) –
  - Metamorphosis II (1940) –
  - Reptiles (1943) –
  - Drawing Hands (1948) –
  - Relativity (1953) –
  - Ascending and Descending (1960) –
  - Waterfall (1961) –
  - Metamorphosis III (1968) –
- André Masson (1896–1987) –
- Jules Pascin (1885–1930) –
- Pablo Picasso (1881–1973) –
  - Don Quixote (1955) –
- Jorge Melício (born 1957) –
  - Erotic Feelings (series) –
- Drawings by Douglas Hamilton –

== See also ==
- Outline of painting
- Outline of sculpture
