= Figure study =

Preparatory artistic study of the human body

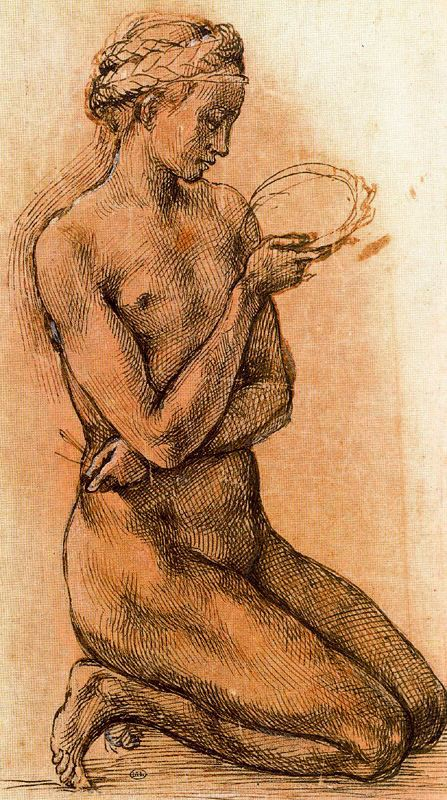
Study of a Kneeling Nude Girl for The Entombment c. 1500–1501 by Michelangelo. It is Michelangelo's only study drawn from a nude female model. It also may be the earliest extant European drawing of a nude female model.

A figure study is a drawing or painting of the human body made in preparation for a more composed or finished work; or to learn drawing and painting techniques in general and the human figure in particular. By preference, figure studies are done from a live model, but may also include the use of other references and the imagination of the artist. The live model may be clothed, or nude, but is usually nude for student work in order to learn human anatomy, or by professionals who establish the underlying anatomy before adding clothing in the final work.

A related term in sculpture is a maquette, a small scale model or rough draft of a proposed work. Drawings may also be preparatory for sculptural work.

Preparatory studies may be compositional, representing the entire proposed work, or may only be of certain details, such as hands and feet. Studies may be sketches completed in a relatively short length of time, or very detailed depending upon the artist's preferred methods. Drawings may concentrate on shapes and form, while studies in painting media are about color and lighting.

The term figure study is sometimes used in photography, but does not seem to be clearly defined as different from nude photography in general, given the inherently finished nature of the medium. Photography students may do work that is for educational purposes, and an artist may take photographs with the intent of using them as references for paintings, but the terms figure study or nude study is usually not limited to these preparatory or educational photos. This usage may have begun in the 19th century, when some photographers called their nude images "studies for artists" merely to evade the censors.

== Education ==
Beginning in the Renaissance drawing the figure from life has been considered the best way to learn how to draw, and the practice has been maintained into the present. Different drawing techniques and exercises have become standard, including gesture, contour, and mass drawings. For beginners first learning to draw, learning to correctly observe real objects is essential in order to learn three dimensional perspective and the effects of lighting. Live models are preferred but if not available, plaster casts of the figure may be used, never photographs.

=== Open drawing groups ===
Experienced artists continue to practice drawing the figure long after their formal education is completed by attending informal groups with no instruction that meet, often weekly, to share the cost of hiring a model. Known by various names, such as sketch groups, figure sessions, etc.; the format is similar to beginning or intermediate drawing classes, being three hours in total that start with a number of gestures and proceed to slightly longer poses, but rarely more than 20 minutes each, only time enough for studies. Such open drawing groups can be found in many locals in the United States, and in other countries that share the Western tradition of figure studies.

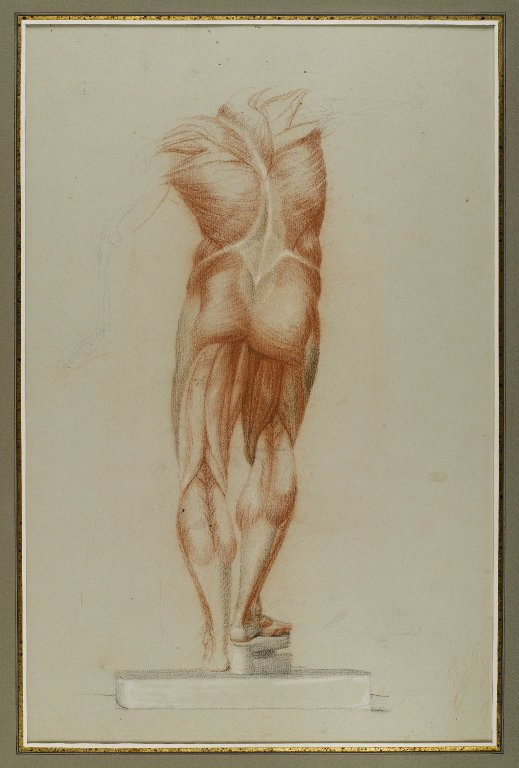
Brooklyn Museum - Figure Study of Musculature - Daniel Huntington

== Preparatory ==
During the 16th to the 19th centuries, painters did numerous drawings and color studies in preparation for large works that might take a year or more to complete. Since the late 19th century studies have become less important as painters adopted of the wet-on-wet, or alla prima painting technique, in which layers of wet paint are applied to previous layers of wet paint, the sketch being merely the first layer. However, the use of studies has been maintained by the academic art tradition.

Color Studies

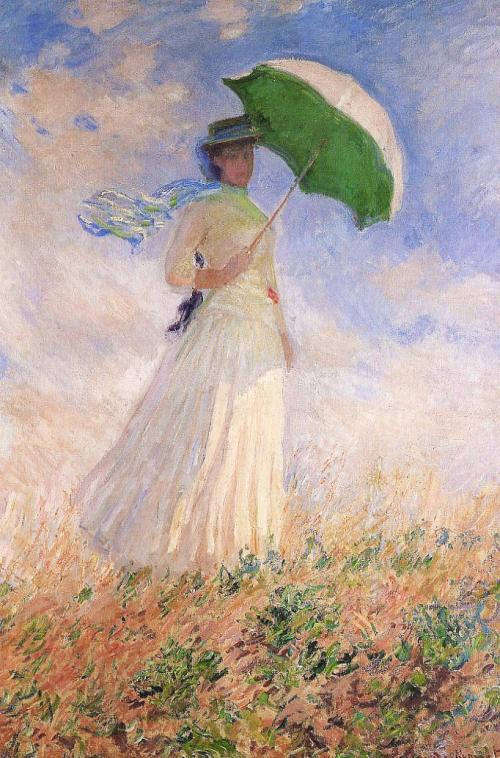
Study of a Figure Outdoors (Facing Right) (1886) by Claude Monet

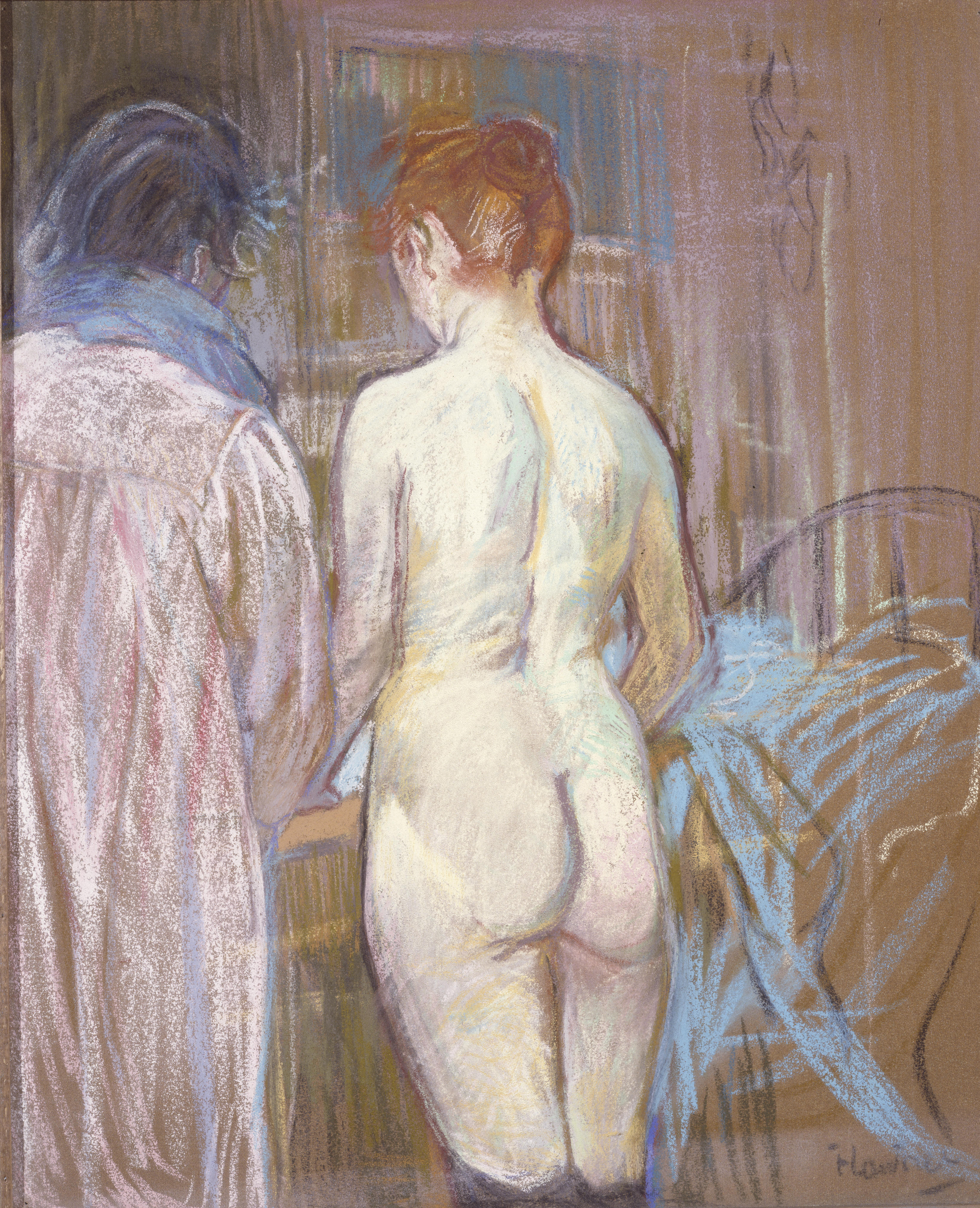
Prostitutes (c1895) by Henri de Toulouse-Lautrec

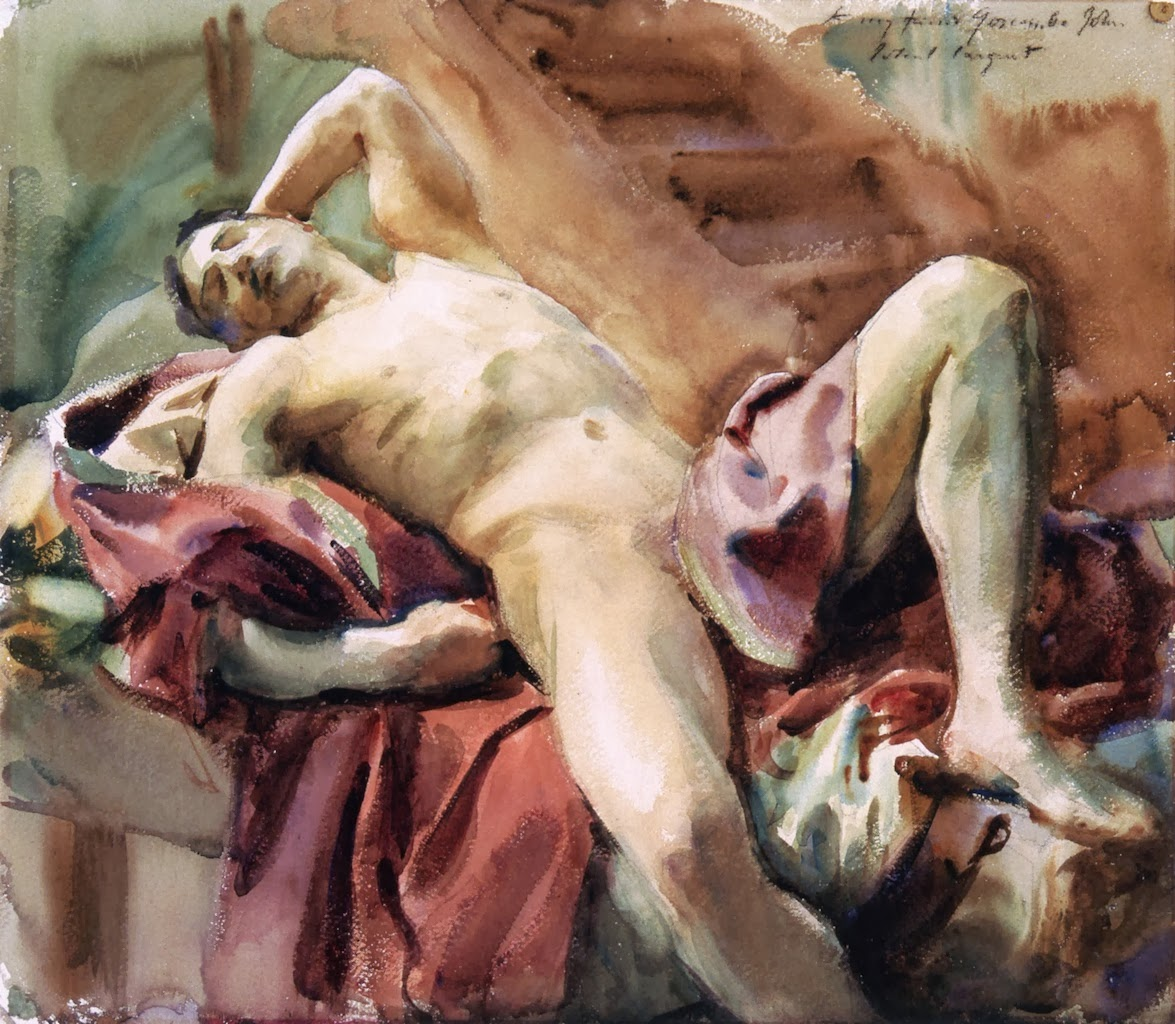
A watercolor figure study by John Singer Sargent.
Study and Completed Painting

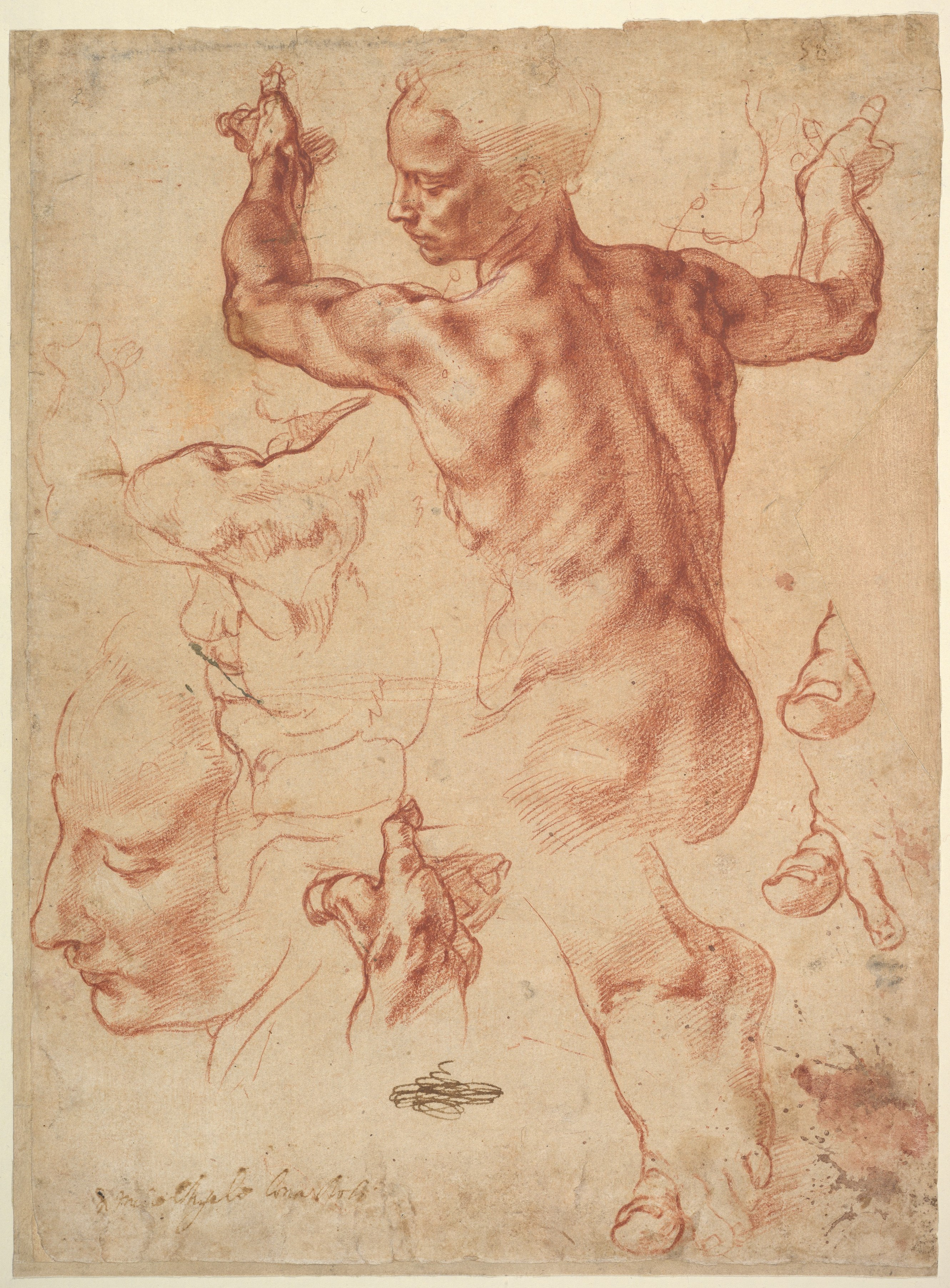
Studies for the Libyan Sibyl by Michelangelo

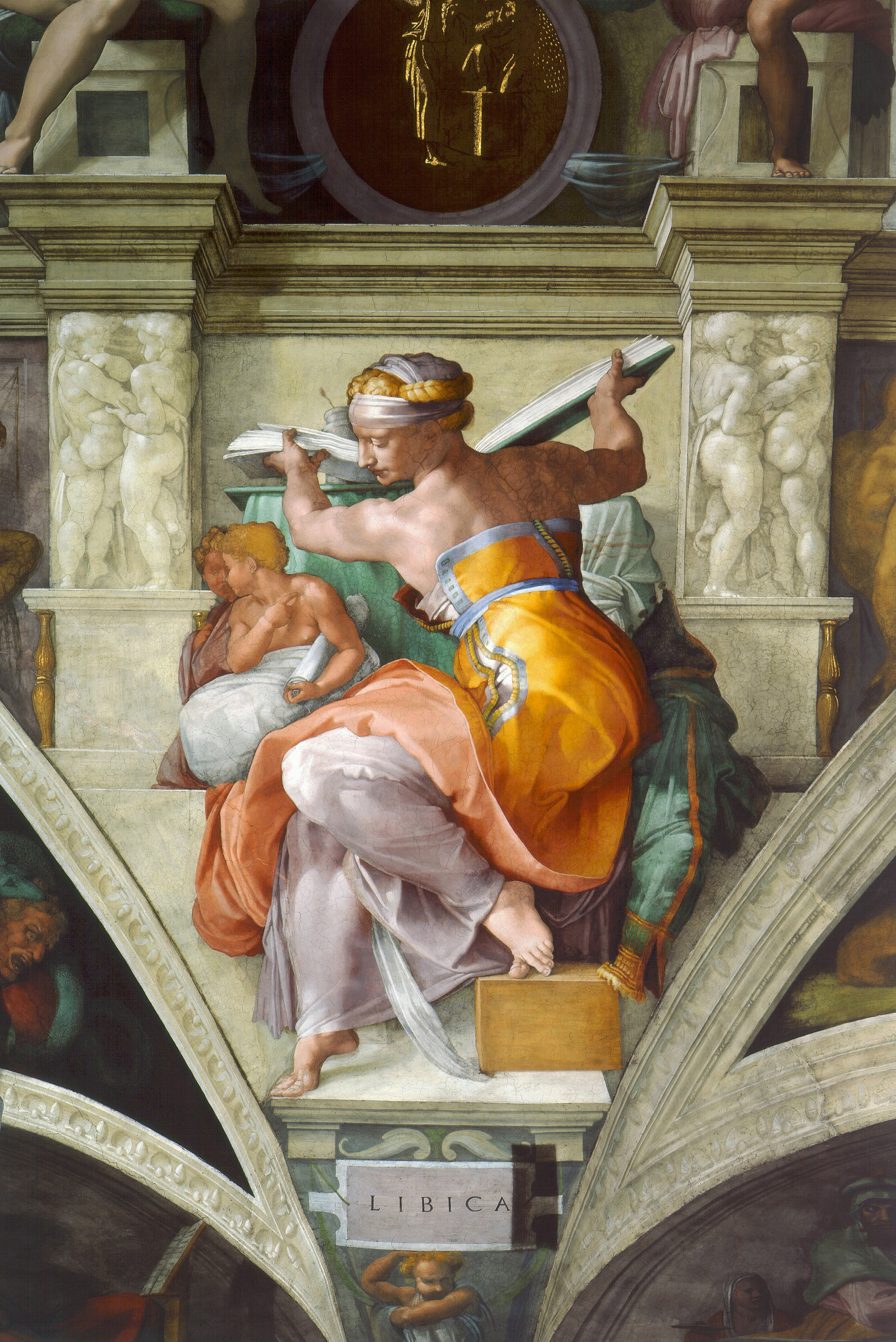
Libyan Sibyl on the Sistine Chapel ceiling

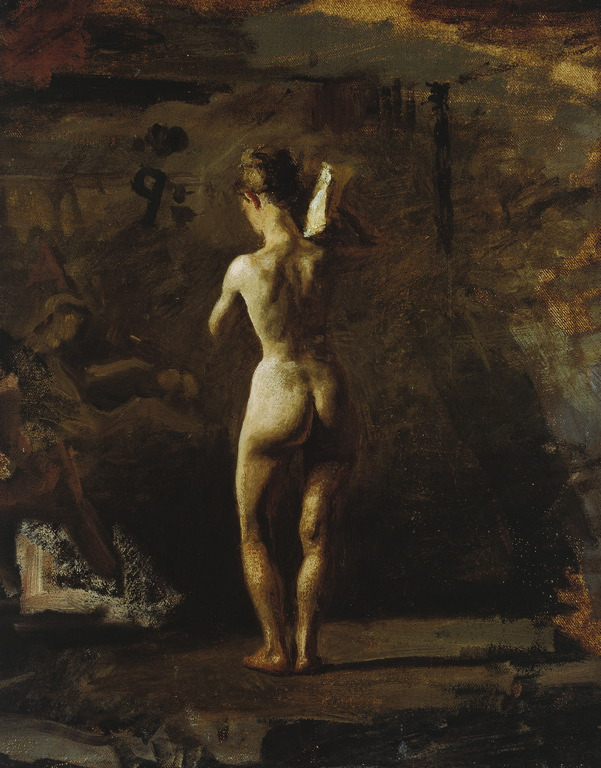
Study for William Rush Carving His Allegorical Figure of the Schuylkill River by Thomas Eakins

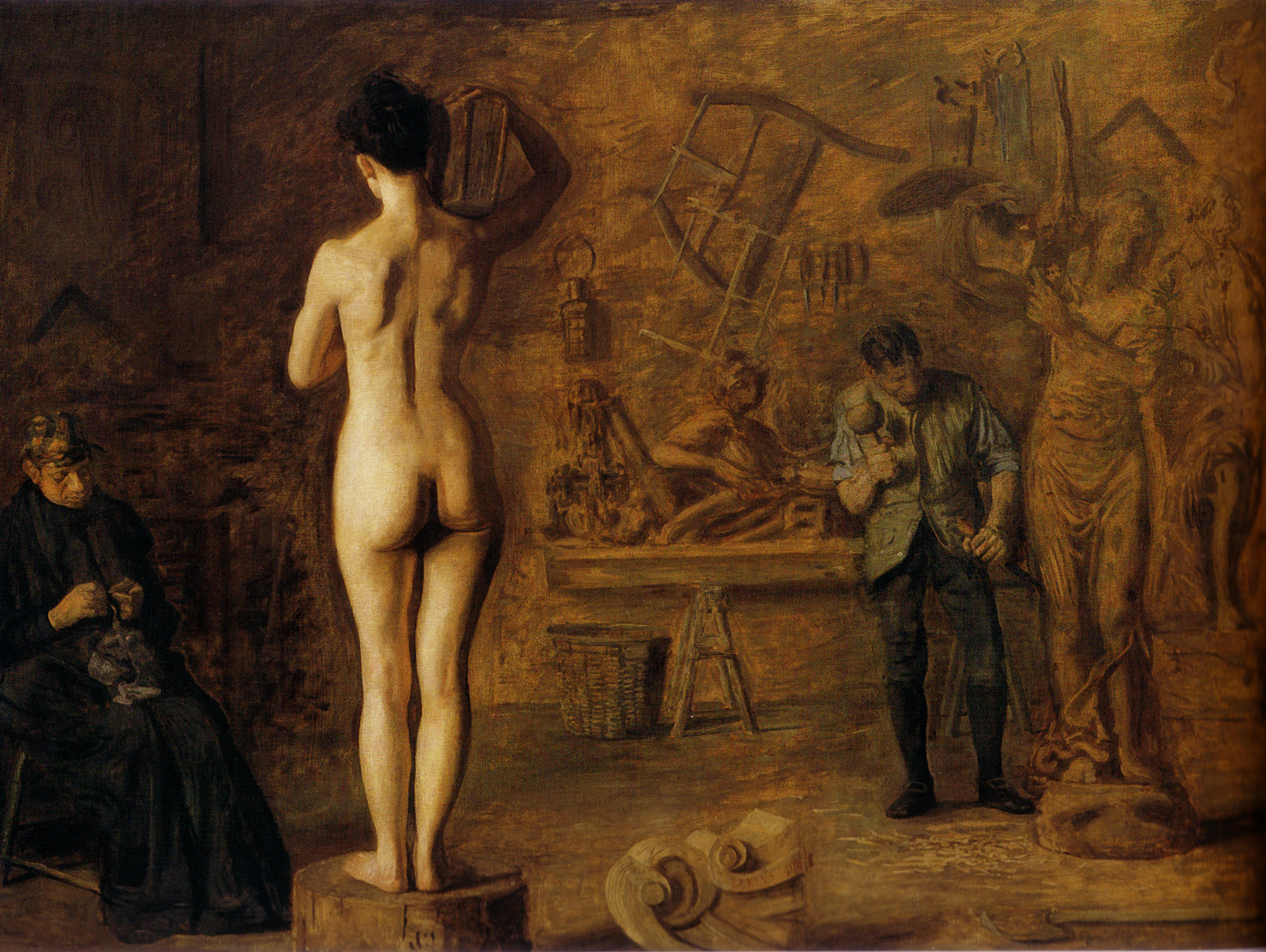
William Rush Carving His Allegorical Figure of the Schuylkill River (1908)
Drawings

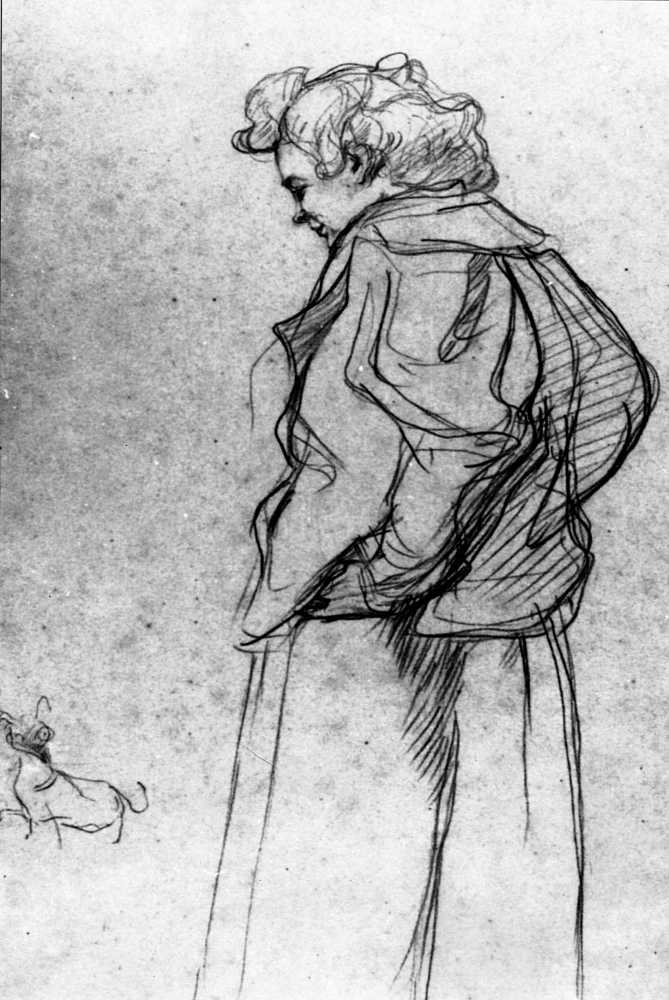
Madame Palmyre with Her Dog (1897) by Henri de Toulouse-Lautrec

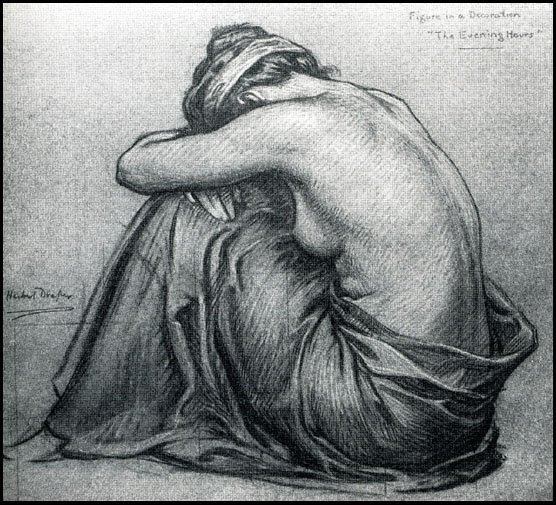
Figure Study by Herbert James Draper

== See also ==
- Nude (art)
- Figure painting
- Figure drawing
- Model (art)
- William Rush and His Model
