= Figure drawing =

Drawing of the usually unclothed human form

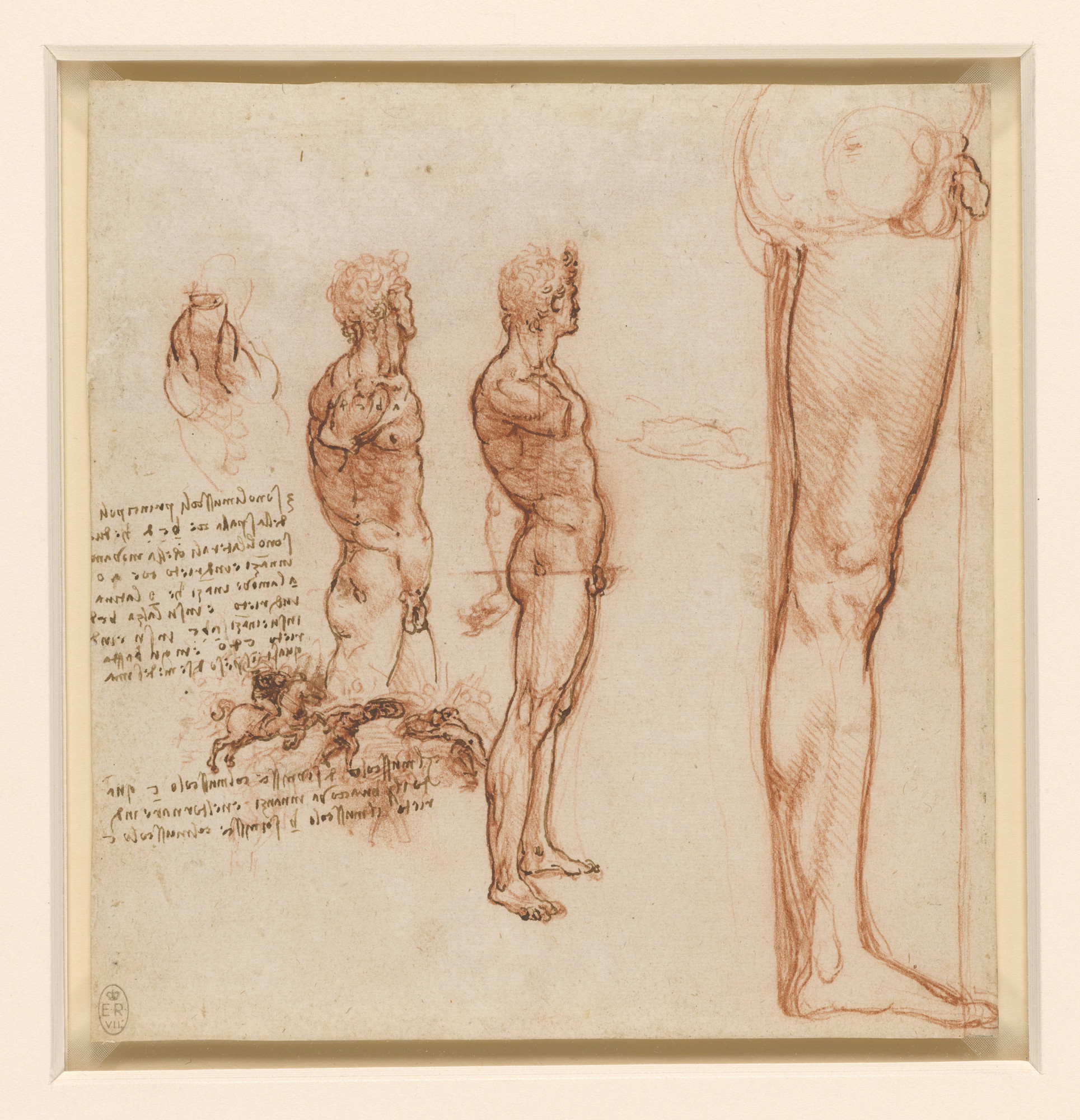
Figure drawing by Leonardo da Vinci

A figure drawing is a drawing of the human form in any of its various shapes and postures, using any of the drawing media. The term can also refer to the act of producing such a drawing. The degree of representation may range from highly detailed, anatomically correct renderings to loose and expressive sketches. A life drawing is a drawing of the human figure, traditionally nude, from observation of a live model. Creating life drawings, or life studies, in a life class, has been a large element in the traditional training of artists in the Western world since the Renaissance.

A figure drawing may be a composed work of art or a figure study done in preparation for a more finished work, such as a painting. Figure drawing is arguably the most difficult subject an artist commonly encounters, and entire courses are dedicated to the subject. The human figure is one of the most enduring themes in the visual arts, and the human figure can be the basis of portraiture, illustration, sculpture, medical illustration, and other fields.

== Approaches ==
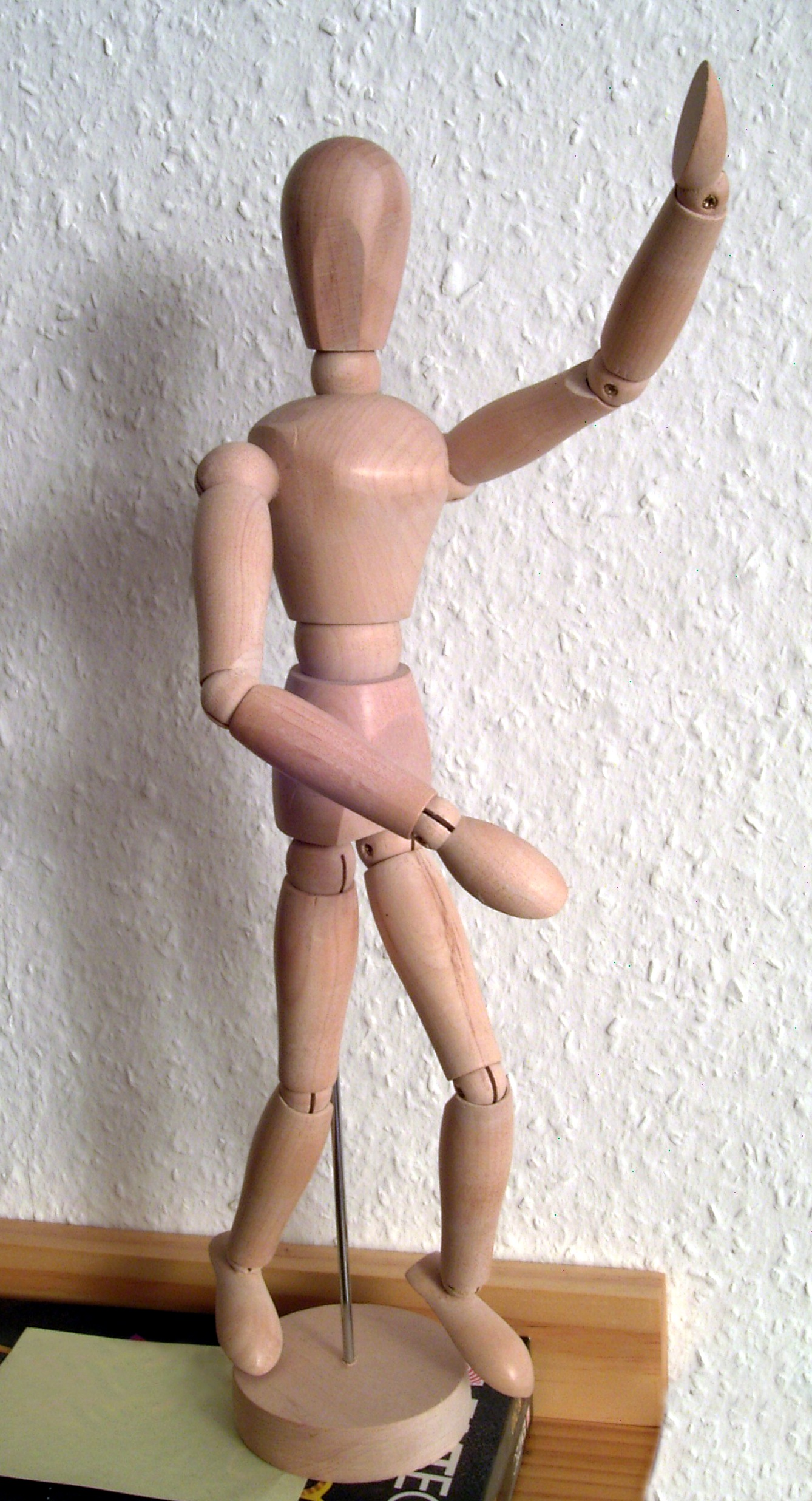
An artist's mannequin is often used to train beginner artists on a standard set of proportions while developing their use of perspective and posture

Artists take a variety of approaches to drawing the human figure. They may draw from live models or from photographs, from mannequin puppets, or from memory and imagination. Most instruction focuses on the use of models in "life drawing" courses. The use of photographic reference—although common since the development of photography—is often criticized or discouraged for its tendency to produce "flat" images that fail to capture the dynamic aspects of the subject. Drawing from imagination is often lauded for the expressiveness it encourages, and criticized for the inaccuracies introduced by the artist's lack of knowledge or limited memory in visualizing the human figure; the experience of the artist with other methods has a large influence on the effectiveness of this approach.

In developing the image, some artists focus on the shapes created by the interplay of light and dark values on the surfaces of the body. Others take an anatomical approach, beginning by approximating the internal skeleton of the figure, overlaying the internal organs and musculature, and covering those shapes with the skin, and finally (if applicable) clothing; the study of human internal anatomy is usually involved in this technique. Another approach is to loosely construct the body out of geometric shapes, e.g., a sphere for the cranium, a cylinder for the torso, etc. Then refine those shapes to more closely resemble the human form.

For those working without visual reference (or as a means of checking one's work), proportions commonly recommended in figure drawing are:

- An average person is generally 7-and-a-half heads tall (including the head). This can be illustrated to students in the classroom using paper plates to visually demonstrate the length of their bodies.
- An ideal figure, used for an impression of nobility or grace, is drawn at 8 heads tall.
- A heroic figure used in the depiction of gods and superheroes is eight-and-a-half heads tall. Most of the additional length comes from a bigger chest and longer legs.

These proportions are most useful for a standing model. Poses which introduce foreshortening of various body parts will cause them to differ.

== Media ==
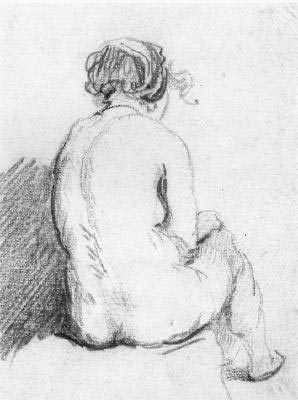
Sitting woman, drawing in black crayon, school of Rembrandt (17th century)

The French Salon in the 19th century recommended the use of Conté crayons, which are sticks of wax, oil and pigment, combined with specially formulated paper. Erasure was not permitted; instead, the artist was expected to describe the figure in light strokes before making darker, more visible marks.

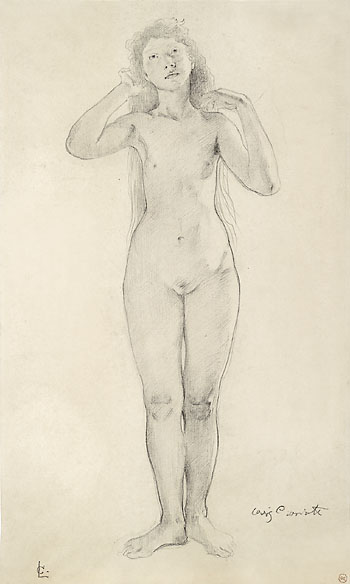
Figure drawing by Lovis Corinth. Before 1925

A popular modern technique is the use of a charcoal stick, prepared from special vines, and a rougher form of paper. The charcoal adheres loosely to the paper, allowing very easy erasure, but the final drawing can be preserved using a spray-on "fixative" to keep the charcoal from rubbing off. Harder compressed charcoal can produce a more deliberate and precise effect, and graduated tones can be produced by smudging with the fingers or with a cylindrical paper tool called a stump.

A graphite pencil is also commonly used for figure drawing. For this purpose, artists' pencils are sold in various formulations, ranging from 9B (very soft) to 1B (medium soft), and from 1H (medium hard) to 9H (very hard). Like charcoal, it can be erased and manipulated using a stump.

Ink is another popular medium. The artist will often start with a graphite pencil to sketch or outline the drawing, then the final line work with a pen or brush, and permanent ink. The ink may be diluted with water to produce gradations, a technique called ink wash. The pencil marks may be erased after the ink is applied, or left in place below the ink.

Some artists draw directly in ink without the preparation of a pencil sketch, preferring the spontaneity of this approach despite the fact that it limits the ability to correct mistakes. Matisse is an artist known to have worked in this way.

A favored method of Watteau and other 17th and 18th-century artists of the Baroque and Rococo eras was to start with a colored ground of tone halfway between white and black, and to add shade in black and highlights in white, using pen and ink or "crayon".

== History ==
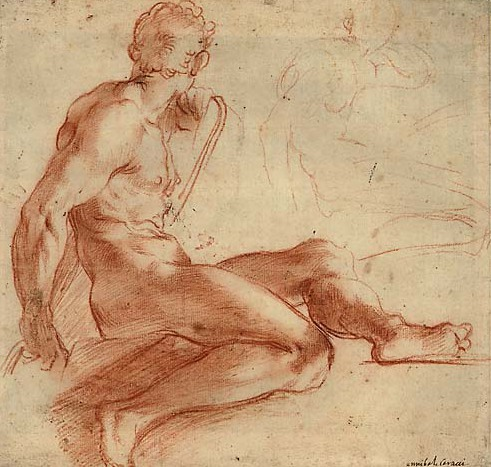
Nude study by Annibale Carracci

The human figure has been the subject of drawings since prehistoric times. While the studio practices of the artists of antiquity are largely a matter of conjecture, that they often drew and modeled from nude models is suggested by the anatomical sophistication of their works. An anecdote related by Pliny describes how Zeuxis reviewed the young women of Agrigentum naked before selecting five whose features he would combine in order to paint an ideal image. The use of nude models in the medieval artist's workshop is implied in the writings of Cennino Cennini, and a manuscript of Villard de Honnecourt confirms that sketching from life was an established practice in the 13th century. The Carracci, who opened their Accademia degli Incamminati in Bologna in the 1580s, set the pattern for later art schools by making life drawing the central discipline. The course of training began with the copying of engravings, then proceeded to drawing from plaster casts, after which the students were trained in drawing from a live model.

In the late 18th century, students in Jacques-Louis David's studio followed a rigorous program of instruction. Mastery in drawing was considered a prerequisite to painting. For about six hours each day, students drew from a model who remained in the same pose for one week. "Eighteenth-century drawings, like that attributed to Jacques-Louis David, were usually executed on tinted paper in red or black chalk with white highlights and a darkened ground. The models' poses tended to be active: standing figures seem about to stir and even seated figures gesticulate dramatically. Close observation of the model's body was secondary to the rendering of his gesture, and many drawings - consistent with academic theory - seem to present a representative figure rather than a specific body or face. In comparison, academies produced in the nineteenth century [...] were typically executed in black chalk or charcoal on white paper and are meticulous depictions of the particularities and idiosyncrasies of the body of the live model. Evidence of the artist's hand is minimized and, although reclining or seated poses are rare, even standing poses are comparatively static..." Before the late 19th century, women were generally not admitted to figure drawing classes.

=== Academy figure ===
An academy figure is a carefully executed drawing or painting of the nude human body, typically at half life size, completed as an exercise in an art school or academy.

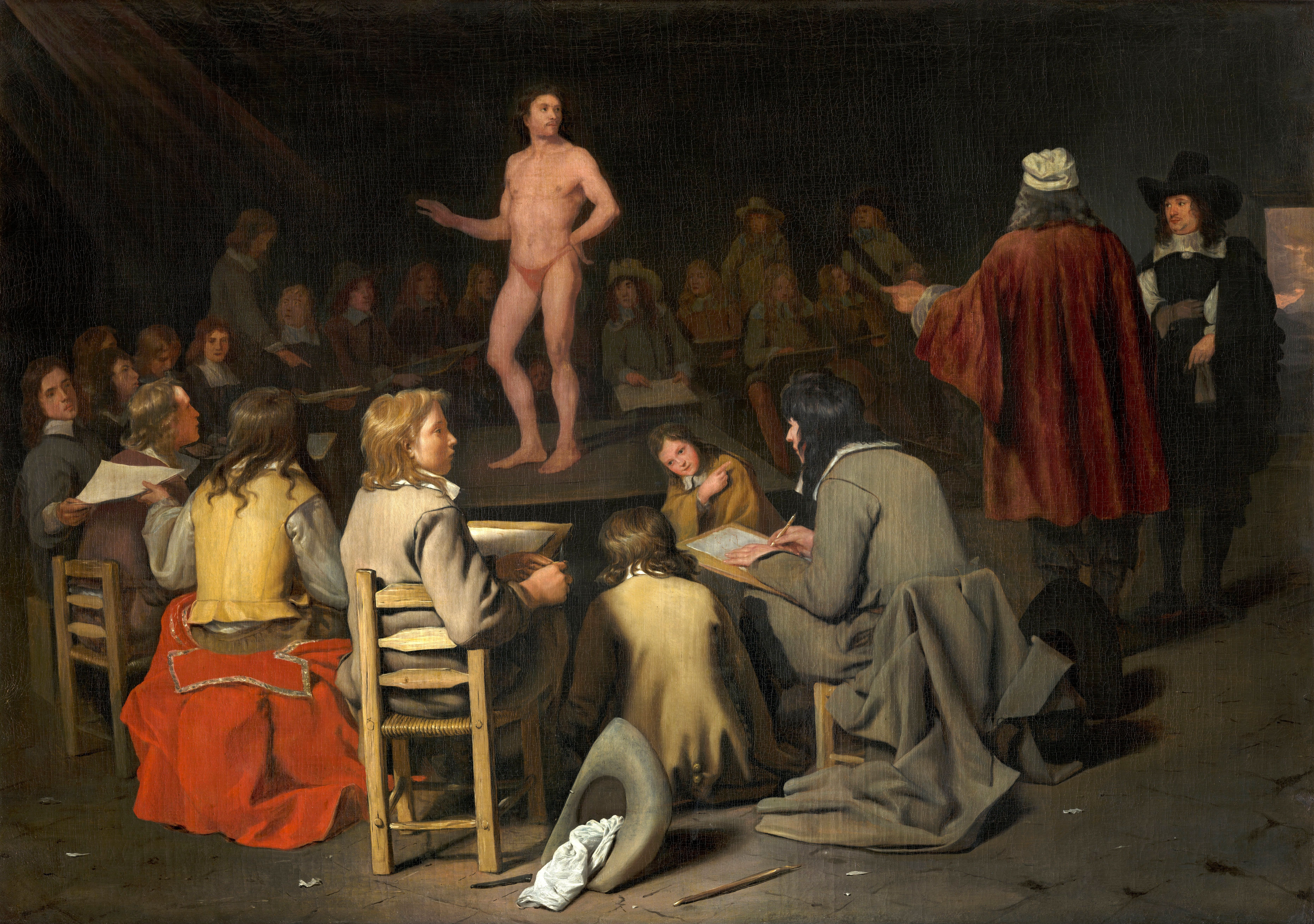
The drawing class, Michiel Sweerts, 1660

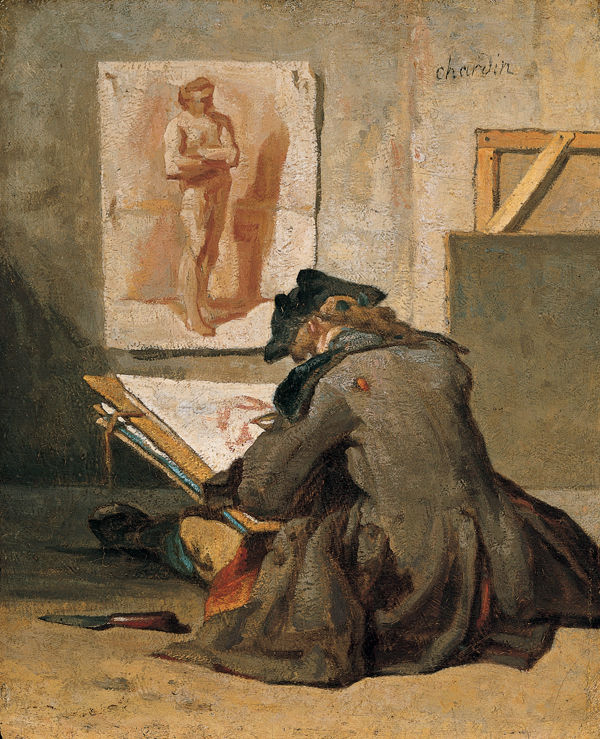
Young Student Drawing, Jean Siméon Chardin, c. 1738

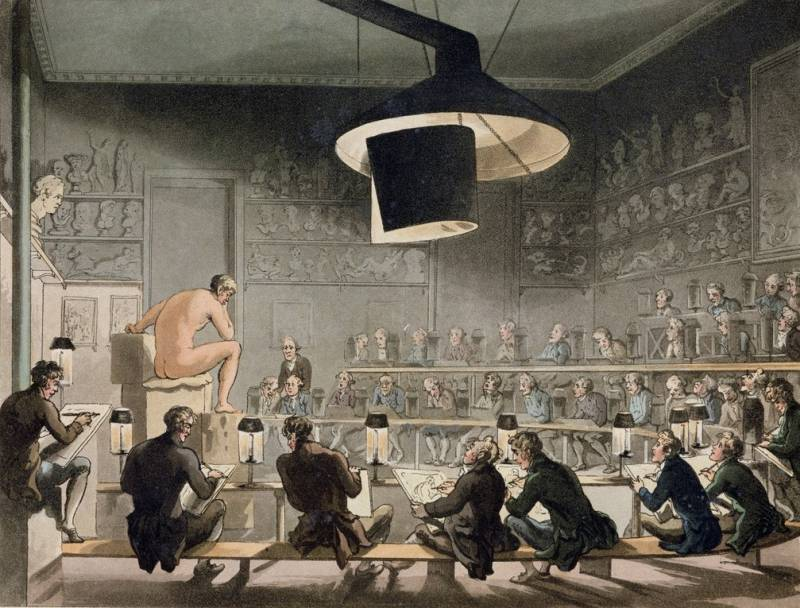
Thomas Rowlandson, Drawing from Life at the Royal Academy, c. 1808–1810

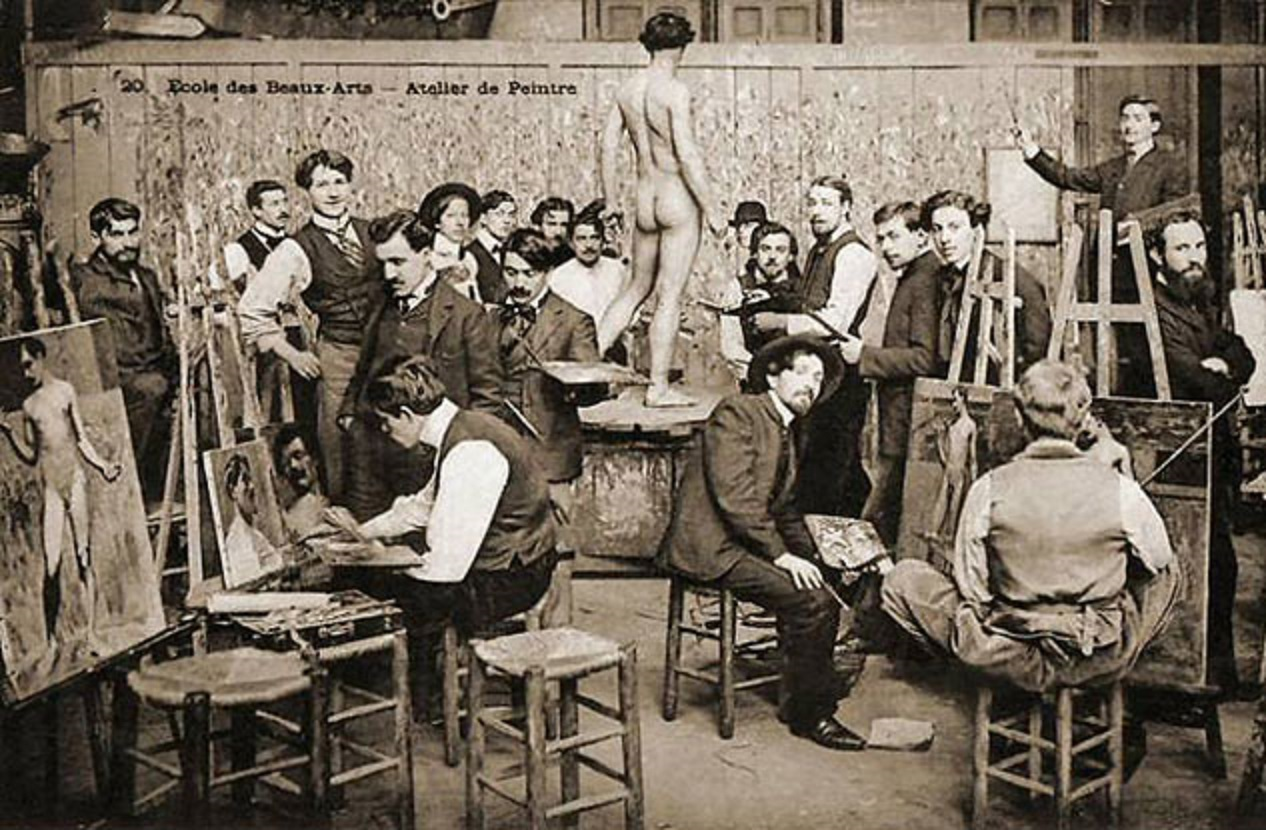
École des beaux-arts, late 19th century

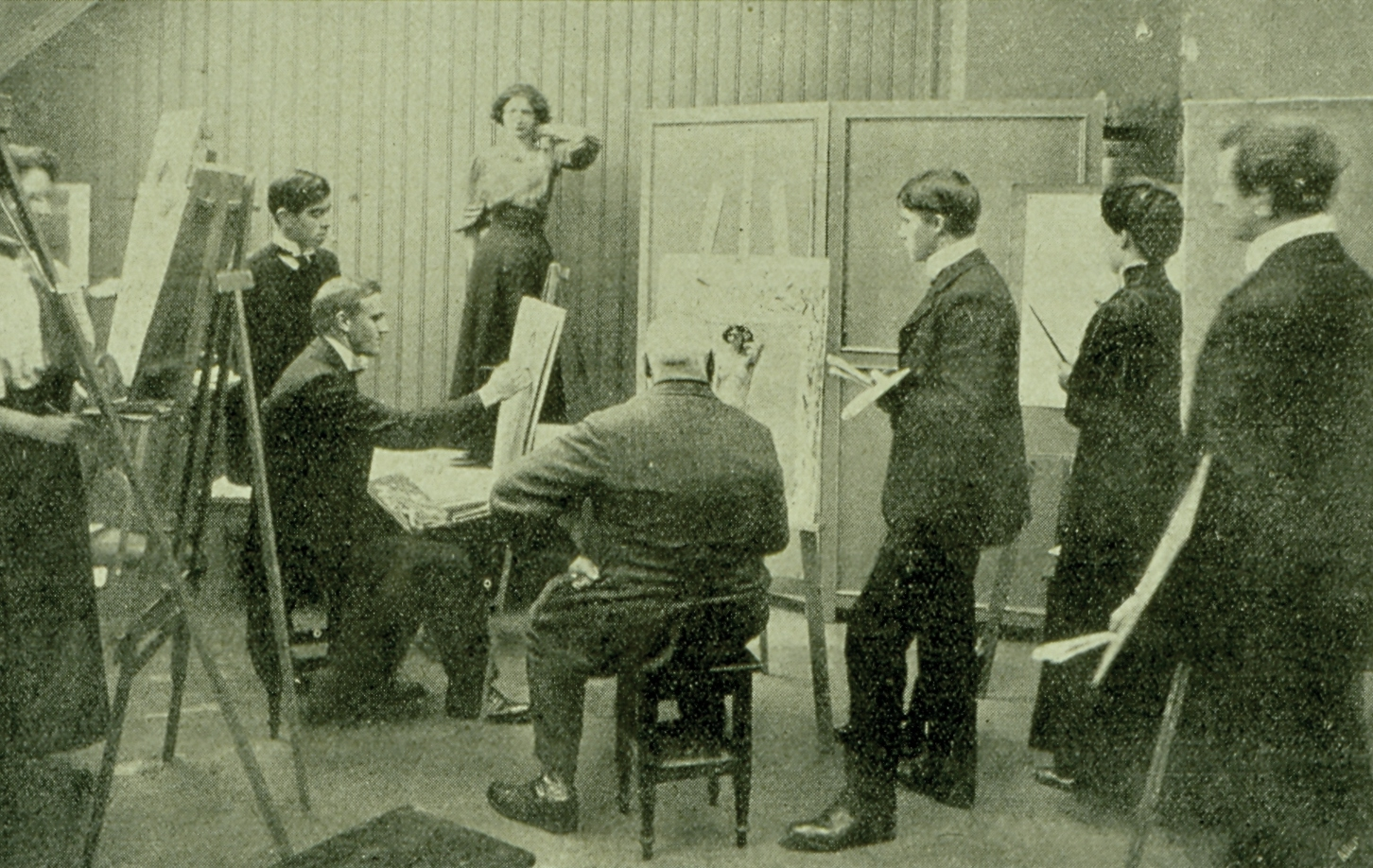
Christian Krohg (1852–1925), seated center, lecturing a class at Statens kunstakademi in Oslo

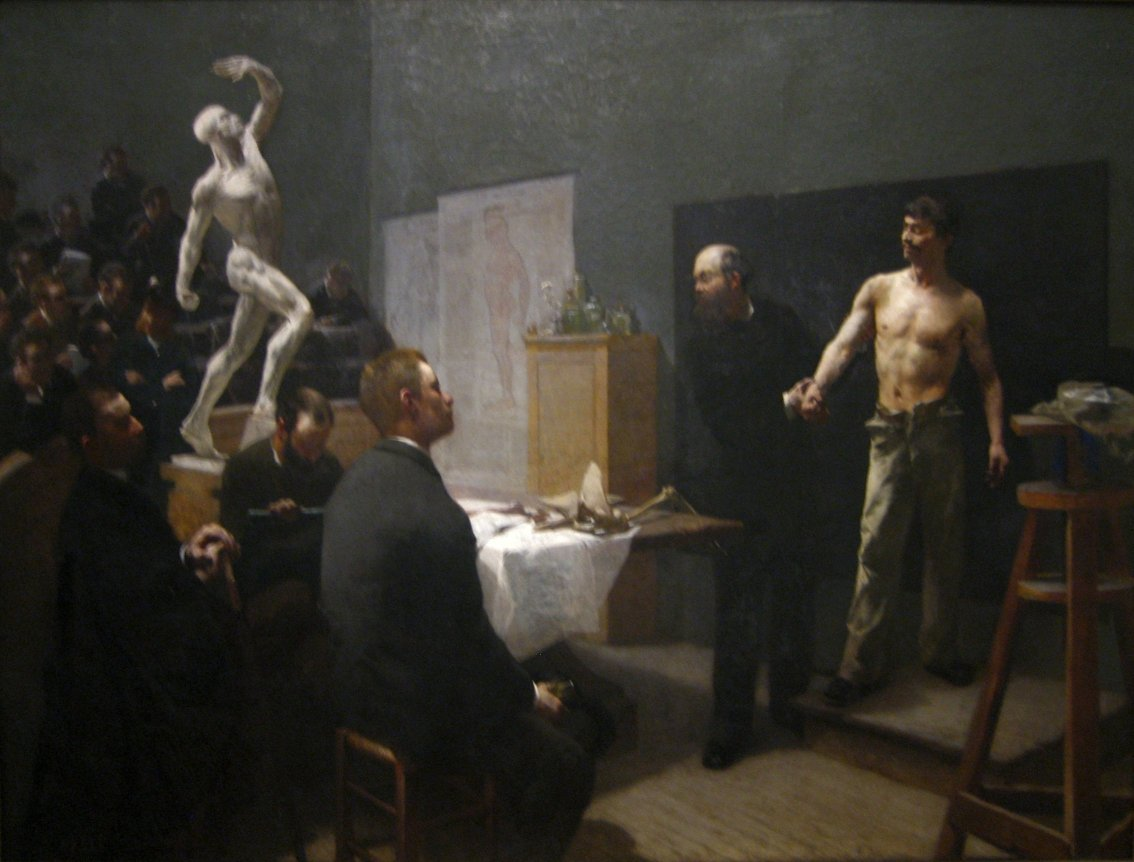
The Anatomy Class at the Ecole des Beaux Arts, François Sallé, 1888

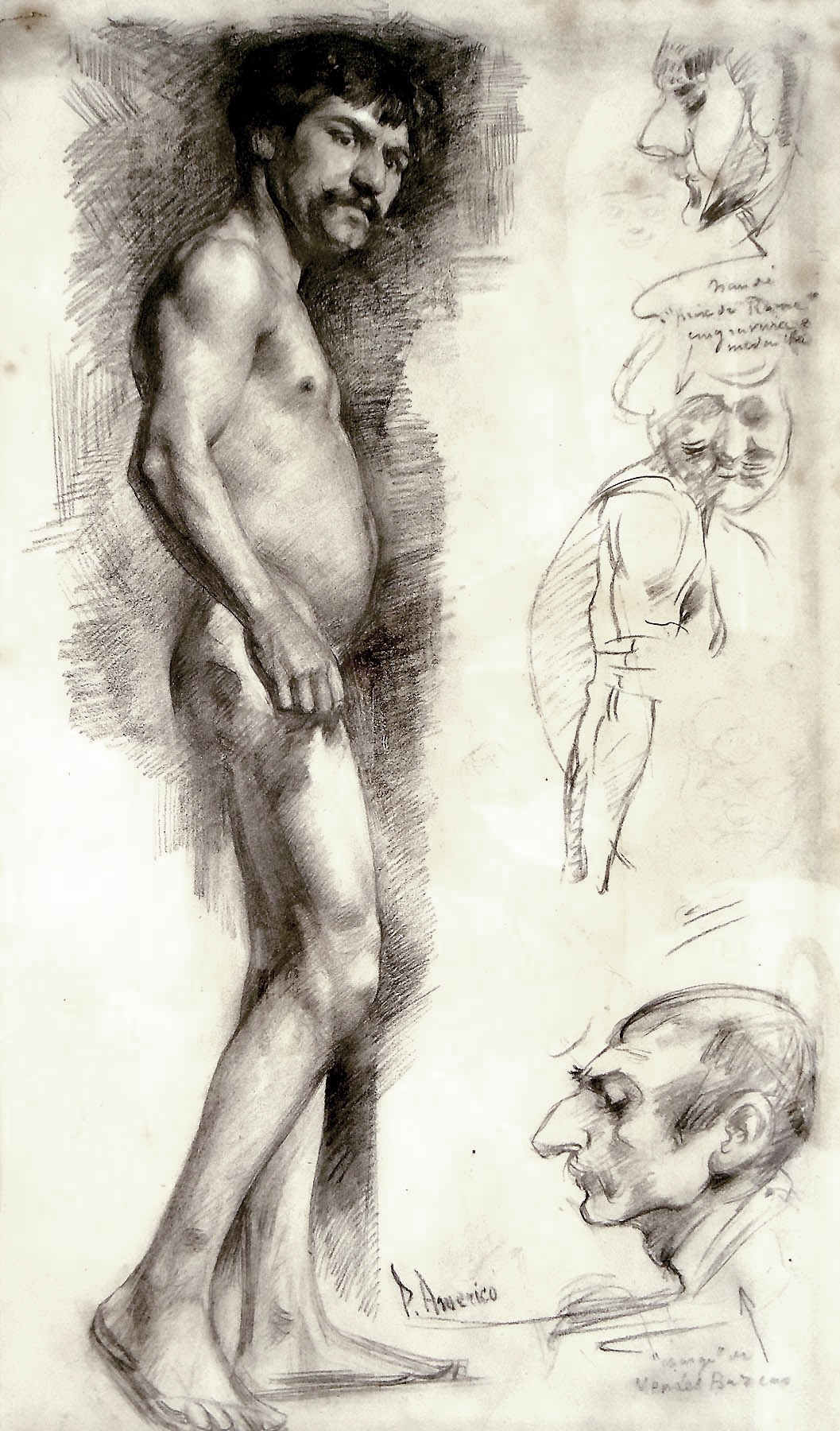
Pedro Américo, Academy, c. 1870

=== Women artists ===
Historical accounts reveal that nude models for aspiring female artists were largely unavailable. Women were barred from certain institutions because it was considered improper and possibly even dangerous for them to study from nude models. Though men were given access to both male and female nudes, women were confined to learning anatomy from casts and models. It was not until 1893 that female students were allowed access to life drawing at the Royal Academy in London, and even then the model was required to be partially draped.

The limited access to nude figures impeded the careers and development of female artists. The most prestigious forms of painting required in-depth knowledge of anatomy that was systematically denied to women, who were thereby relegated to less-regarded forms of painting such as genre, still life, landscape, and portraiture. In Linda Nochlin’s essay, "Why have There Been No Great Women Artists" she identifies the restricted access that women had to nude figure drawing as a historically significant barrier to women's artistic development.

== Contemporary studio instruction ==
Figure drawing instruction is an element of most fine art and illustration programs. For example, Academies of fine art in Italy have a scuola libera del nudo [free school of the nude] which forms part of the degree program but is also open to external students. In a typical figure drawing studio classroom, the students sit around a model either in a semicircle or a full circle. No two students have exactly the same view, thus their drawing will reflect the perspective of the artist's unique location relative to the model. The model often poses on a stand, to enable students to more easily find an unobstructed view. Depending on the type of pose, furniture and/or props may be used. These are typically included in the drawing, to the extent that they are visible to the artist. However, backgrounds are commonly ignored unless the objective is to learn about placement of figures in an environment. Individual models are most common, but multiple models may be used in more advanced classes. Many studios are equipped to allow a variety of lighting arrangements.

When taught at the college level, figure drawing models are often (but not always) nude. While posing, the model is usually requested to remain perfectly still. Because of the difficulty of doing this for an extended period of time, periodic breaks for the model to rest and/or stretch are usually included in longer sessions and for more difficult poses.

At the beginning of a figure drawing session, the model is often requested to make a series of brief poses in rapid succession. These are called gesture poses, and are typically one to three minutes each. Gesture drawing is a warm-up exercise for many artists, although some artists sketch out the gesture as the first step in every figure drawing. These broad strokes are not just done by the flick of a wrist, but by using the whole arm to capture the motion of the model. It also helps to keep the artist focused on the model instead of the paper. Because small errors of proportion in depictions of the human body are easily noticed, artists often spend a significant amount of time training in this discipline.

Modern and contemporary artists may choose to exaggerate or distort proportions to emphasise the gesture or perceived mood of the models' pose. The outcomes can be regarded as a finished artwork, expressing both the subject, the observational, emotional and mark making response to the artists figure drawing experience.

Anatomy is only the first level of concern in life classes. Figure-ground relationships and other aspects of composition are also considered. Balance of a composition becomes more crucial and therefore more understood through life drawing. The artist's kinesthetic response to the pose and how this is conveyed through a choice of art media is a more advanced concern. Since the purpose of figure drawing classes is to learn how to draw humans of all kinds, male and female models of all ages, shapes, and ethnicities are usually sought, rather than selecting only beautiful models or those with "ideal" figures. Some instructors specifically seek to avoid the sort of models preferred by fashion photographers, seeking more "realistic" examples and to avoid any implication of sexual objectification. Instructors may also favor models of particular body types based on the unique contours or surface textures they provide. The variety of models hired may be limited by the need for them to hold a pose for extended periods (eliminating restless children and frail older persons), and concerns of modesty and legality when models pose nude (restricting the use of minors).

== See also ==
- Artistic canons of body proportions – Criteria used in formal figurative art
- Croquis – Quick sketch of a live model
- Depictions of nudity – Visual representations of the nude human form
  - History of the nude in art
  - Nude photography (art) – Artistic photography of the naked human body
- Figure painting – Genre of painting that represents the human form
- Model (art) – Person who poses for a visual artist
