= The Many Ways of Seeing =

1969 children's book

The Many Ways of Seeing: An Introduction to the Pleasures of Art
- Author: Janet Gaylord Moore
- Language: English
- Genre: Children's literature
- Publisher: World
- Publication date: 1969
- Publication place: United States

The Many Ways of Seeing: An Introduction to the Pleasures of Art is a 1969 art criticism book by Janet Gaylord Moore. Moore explains artistic concepts like perspective, composition, color theory, countouring, and tone, along with examples from famous artists to explain the concepts. The last section of the book focuses on media like watercolor, lithography, collage, and sculpture. The book earned a Newbery Honor in 1970.
