= Gesture (disambiguation) =

A gesture is a body movement that conveys some meaning.

Gesture may refer also to:

- Gesture (music)
- Gesture drawing
- Gesture recognition in computing
- The Gestures, a teenage American rock band based
- Gestures (album), an album by Maksim Mrvica
- Pointing device gesture, an interaction with a computer interface using a pointing device or finger
