= Betty Edwards =

American art teacher and author (born 1926)

- Born: April 19, 1926 (age 100); San Francisco, California, U.S.
- Education: University of California, Los Angeles
- Known for: Author Art Educator

Betty Edwards (born April 19, 1926) is an American art teacher and author best known for her 1979 book Drawing on the Right Side of the Brain (as of April 2012, in its 4th edition). She taught and did research at the California State University, Long Beach, until she retired in the late 1990s. While there, she founded the Center for the Educational Applications of Brain Hemisphere Research.

== Professional life ==
Edwards received a bachelor of arts from the University of California, Los Angeles (UCLA, 1947), a master of arts from California State University, Northridge, and a doctorate in Art, Education, and Psychology from UCLA (1976).

Drawing on the Right Side of the Brain has remained the dominant book on its subject, used as a standard text in many art schools, and has been translated and published in many foreign languages, including French, Spanish, German, Polish, Hungarian, Chinese, and Japanese. Her company, Drawing on the Right Side of the Brain, develops special drawing tools, materials, and videos to help individuals learn to draw.

A painter, she taught at high school level in the Los Angeles public school district (Venice High School), then at community college, and from 1978 until her retirement in 1991, in the art department at California State University, Long Beach. All of her teaching experience has been in art: drawing, painting, art history, art-teacher training, and color theory. In addition to teaching drawing workshops around the world, she has also done business consulting with major national and international corporations to enhance creative problem solving.

=== Theories on drawing and brain function ===
Edwards's method of drawing and teaching was revolutionary when she published it in 1979. It received an immediate positive response, and is now widely accepted by artists, teachers, and others around the world. Underlying the method is the notion that the brain has two ways of perceiving and processing reality – one verbal and analytic, the other visual and perceptual. Edwards' method advocates suppressing the former in favor of the latter. It focuses on disregarding preconceived notions of what the drawn object should look like, and on individually "seeing". Drawing, says Edwards, has five component skills of perception and drawing:

- Edges and lines (includes copying drawings and contour drawing exercises)
- Negative space (i.e. space between items)
- Relationships (i.e. perspective and proportion between things)
- Light and shadows (shading)
- The whole: gestalt which emerges as the first four are taught

Then there are two additional skills, numbers 6 and 7:

- Drawing from memory
- Drawing from imagination

Edwards's early work was based in part on her understanding of neuroscience, especially the cerebral hemisphere research which suggested that the two hemispheres of the brain have different functions. To avoid the so-called "location controversy" (how the two major cognitive functions are distributed in the individual brain depending on handedness and other factors), she termed the modes "L-mode" and "R-mode." These designations appeared in the original 1979 edition of "Drawing on the Right Side of the Brain." She described L-mode as basically a verbal, analytic, sequential mode of thinking, and R-mode as basically visual, perceptual, and global.

== Bibliography ==
Edwards' major publications include:

- Edwards, Betty (1979). Drawing on the right side of the brain: a course in enhancing creativity and artistic confidence. Los Angeles; New York: J. P. Tarcher; distributed by St. Martin's Press. ISBN 978-0-87477-087-2.
- Edwards, Betty (1986). Drawing on the artist within: a guide to innovation, invention, imagination, and creativity. New York: Simon and Schuster. ISBN 978-0-671-49386-8.
- Edwards, Betty (1999). The New Drawing on The Right Side of the Brain. Penguin Putnam. ISBN 978-0-87477-424-5.
- Edwards, Betty (2004). Color: a course in mastering the art of mixing colors. New York: Jeremy P. Tarcher/Penguin. ISBN 978-1-58542-199-2.
- Edwards, Betty (2012). Drawing on the Right Side of the Brain Workbook. Penguin. ISBN 978-1-58542-922-6.
- Edwards, Betty (2012). Drawing on the Right Side of the Brain: The Definitive, 4th Edition. Penguin. ISBN 978-1-58542-920-2.

== See also ==
- Dual-coding theory
- Functional specialization (brain)
- Lateralization of brain function
- Roger Sperry
- Split-brain
