= Tortillon =

A roll of paper used to make smudges on paper for art uses

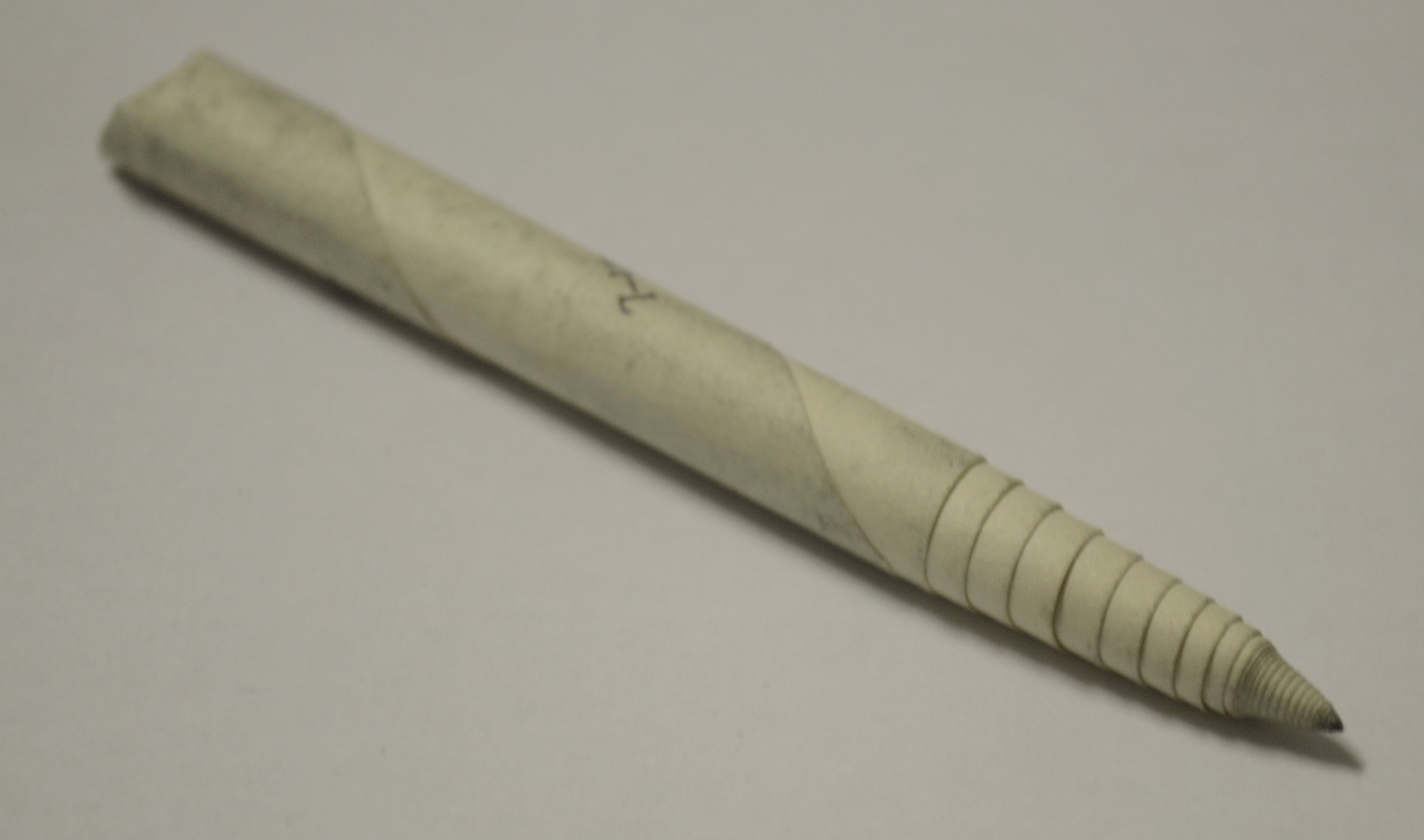
A tortillon, a drawing tool used to smudge

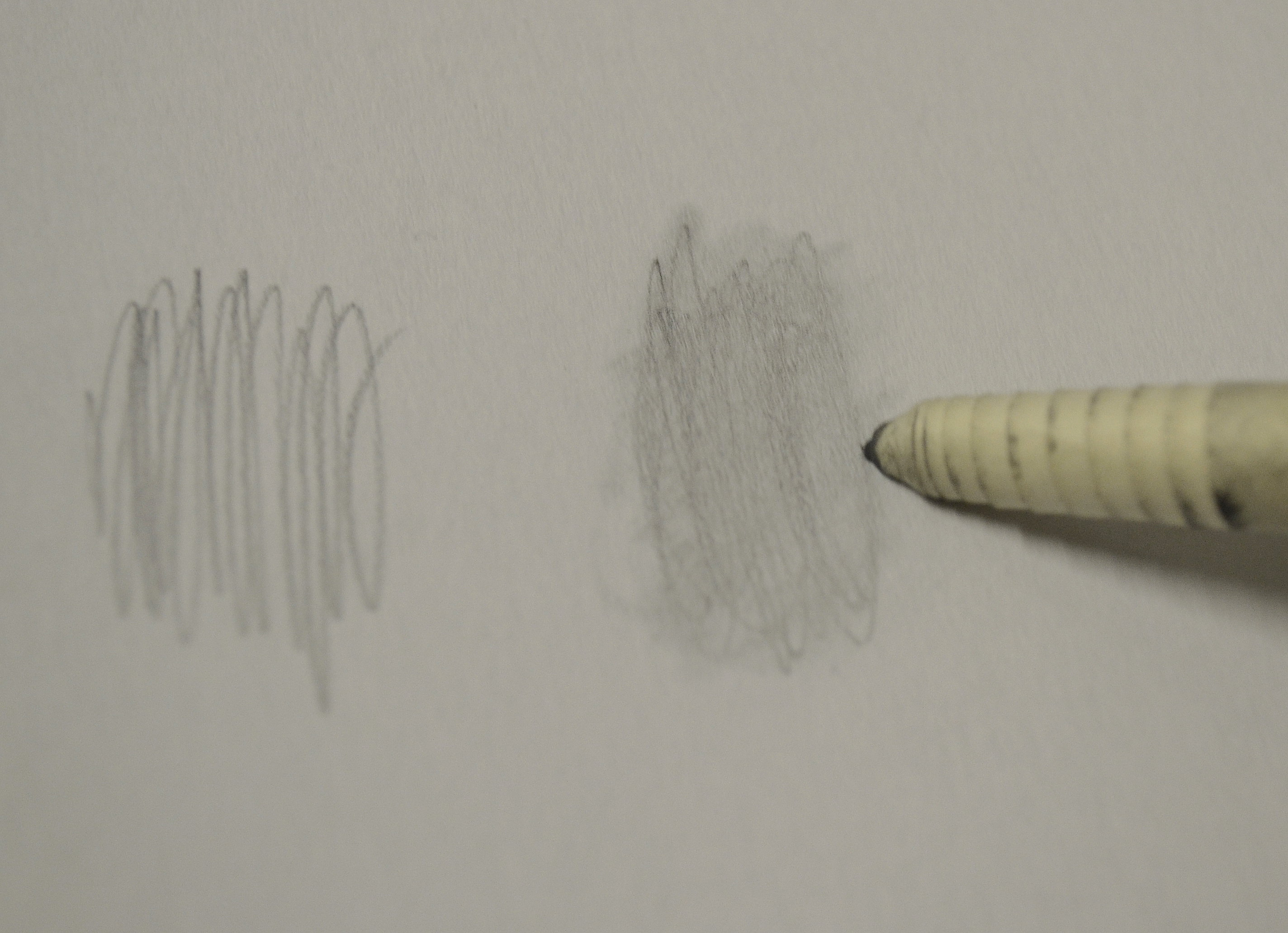
A tortillon being used to blend

A tortillon (/tɔːrˈtiːjɒn/; also blending stump) is a cylindrical drawing tool, tapered at the end and usually made of rolled paper. It is used by artists to smudge or blend marks made with charcoal, Conté crayon, pencil or other drawing media.

A blending stump is similar to a tortillon but is longer, more tightly wrapped, and pointed at both ends. Tortillons produce slightly different textures than stumps when blending, and they are hollow, whereas stumps are solid.

Cleaning of tortillons and stumps usually involves removing the used outer layer of paper by scraping or rubbing it on an abrasive surface, such as sandpaper, carpet, rubber erasers, or an emery board. Some people also whittle off the tip if it becomes dull, or mashed in.
