= Janet Gaylord Moore =

American author, curator, and artist

- Born: Janet Gaylord; June 2, 1906; Hanover, New Hampshire, US
- Died: 1992 (aged 85–86); Stonington, Maine, US
- Resting place: Wilton, Connecticut, US
- Occupations: Author, curator, artist
- Writing career
- Genres: Art, Children's Literature

Janet Gaylord Moore (1906-1992) was an American writer, curator, and artist. Her book The Many Ways of Seeing: An Introduction to the Pleasures of Art was a Newbery Honor recipient in 1970. This title, along with her 1979 book, The Eastern Gate: An Introduction to the Arts of China and Japan, also netted Moore the 1980 Cleveland Arts Prize for Literature.

== Biography ==
Moore was born in Hanover, New Hampshire, in 1906. She obtained an undergraduate degree from Vassar College, followed by graduate work in fine arts at Columbia University. Moore then studied painting abroad, with stops in France, Italy, and China, before returning to the United States and studying under George Grosz at the Art Students League of New York.

Moore began teaching at Miss Hewitt's School in New York City, before moving to Cleveland, Ohio, where she would stay for the remainder of her career. She taught at the Laurel School for Girls from 1947 to 1961. This was followed by employment at the Cleveland Museum of Art, where she rose to the position of curator of the department of art history and education. In 1967, Moore also began working as an adjunct professor at Case Western Reserve University.

In 1975, Moore retired, and moved to a cottage on the Maine coast. She was still living in Maine at the time of her death in 1992.

== Honors ==
- First prize, Cleveland Museum of Art, May 1948 show
- Newbery Honor, 1970, for The Many Ways of Seeing: An Introduction to the Pleasures of Art
- Special Citation for Distinguished Service to the Arts, Cleveland Arts Prize, 1974
- Cleveland Arts Prize for Literature, 1980, for The Many Ways of Seeing: An Introduction to the Pleasures of Art and The Eastern Gate: An Introduction to the Arts of China and Japan
