= Mass drawing =

Drawing exercise

Mass drawing refers to rendering the solidity of the subject by masses of tone or color, without emphasizing lines or edges. Also called weight and modeled drawings, they are one of the basic exercises in figure drawing along with contour drawing and gesture drawing.
