= Studies for the Libyan Sibyl =

1511 drawing by Michelangelo

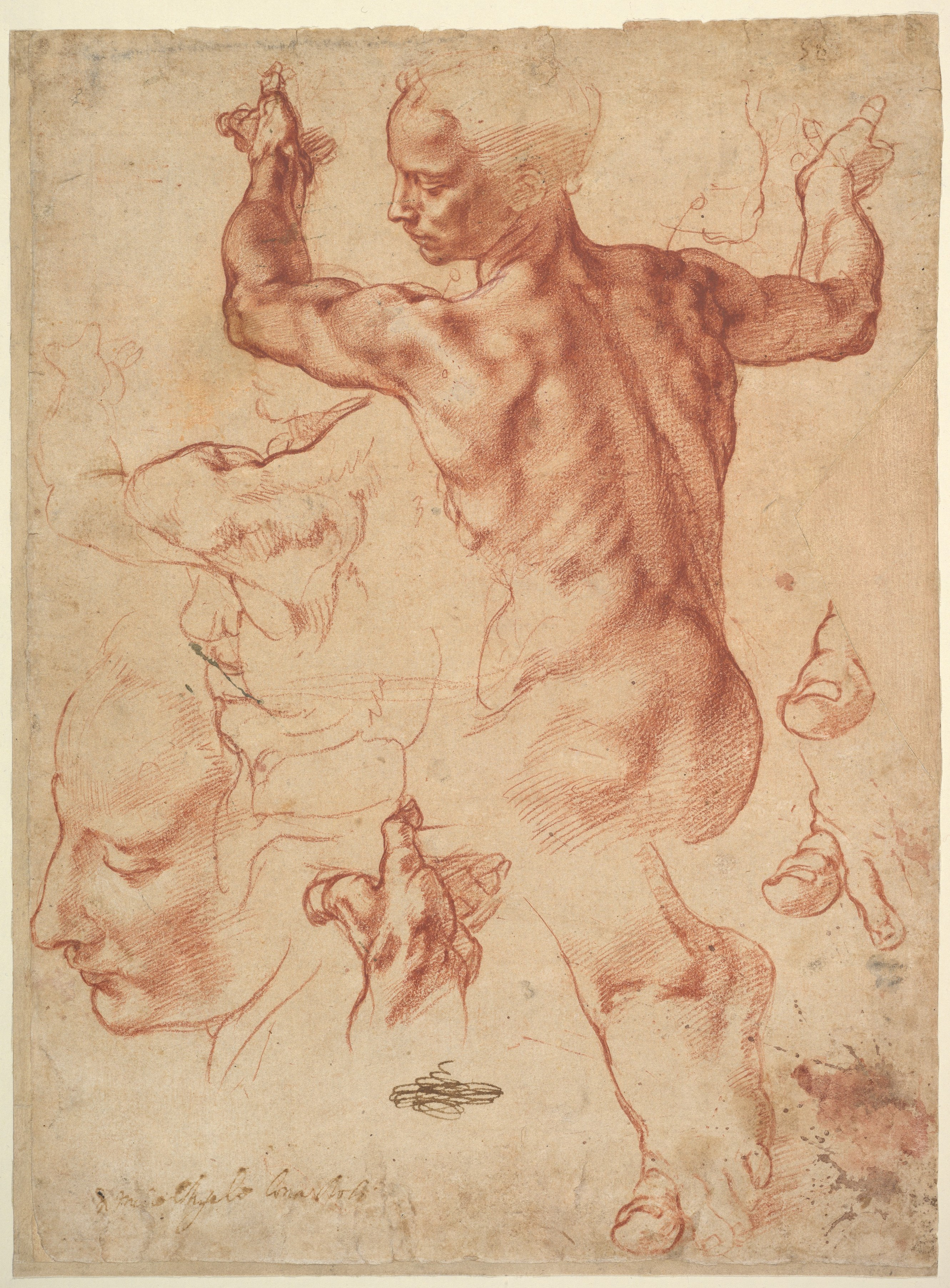
- Year: 1511
- Dimensions: 28.9 cm (11.4 in) × 21.4 cm (8.4 in)
- Location: Metropolitan Museum of Art
- Accession no.: 24.197.2
- Identifiers: The Met object ID: 337497

Studies for the Libyan Sibyl (recto); Studies for the Libyan Sibyl and a small Sketch for a Seated Figure (verso) is a 1511 drawing by Michelangelo. It is in the collection of the Metropolitan Museum of Art.

== Description and interpretation ==
This drawing is a double-sided preparatory sketch for the painting of the Libyan Sibyl as part Sistine Chapel commission. The recto (or front) side of this chalk drawing displays a young male figure twisting over his left-hand shoulder while holding up an imaginary object. We now know (based on the final painting in the Sistine Chapel) that the sibyl holds open a large book. Even though the finished figure is in fact a woman, the sketch shows emphasis on the model's muscles and definition of his male physique.

The verso side of this study depicts a seated figure in the center of the image, along with a detailed sketch of a knee and small figure in the top right corner. The central figure depicts anatomical renderings more closely related to feminine features, rather than masculine. Michelangelo was known for using male models for his depictions of women, with muscles and forms more masculine in nature as is evident in the recto side of this drawing.

== Influence ==
Early Christian imagery steered away from nakedness until the mid-thirteenth century and became more widely used throughout the Renaissance. Michelangelo's depictions of nudes were prevalent in his religious commissions with a focus on physical power of the male figure.

== See also ==
- List of works by Michelangelo
