= Stump (drawing) =

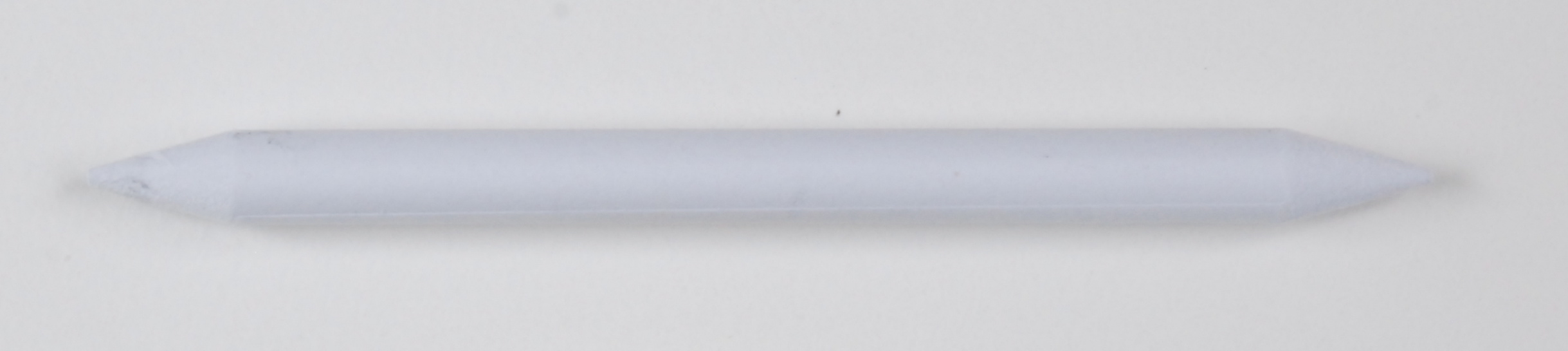
Stump

A stump or blending stump is a pencil-shaped tool used by artists to smudge or blend marks made with charcoal, Conté crayon, pencil or other drawing media. It is usually made of soft paper that is tightly wound into a stick and sanded to a point at both ends. By its use, gradations and evenly-shaded tones can be produced.

Stumps are typically made of paper but can also be made of felt or leather. They are sold commercially in a range of sizes suitable for manipulations covering large areas, for operations on a miniature scale, and those in-between. A variant that is not as tightly packed and has a hollow core is called tortillon.

== Technique ==
When blending, a stump may be held at an angle to increase the surface area that contacts the paper. The tip of the stump must be kept clean while blending in light-toned areas of a drawing, so as to not smear darker media from other areas onto it. Eventually the tool will become dull from use; sandpaper pointers are often used to clean and re-sharpen it.

While similar effects can be produced by smudging with one's fingers, this deposits oil from the skin onto the drawing surface, making the surface less receptive to the charcoal or other drawing medium.
