= Jorge Melício =

Portuguese sculptor (born 1957)

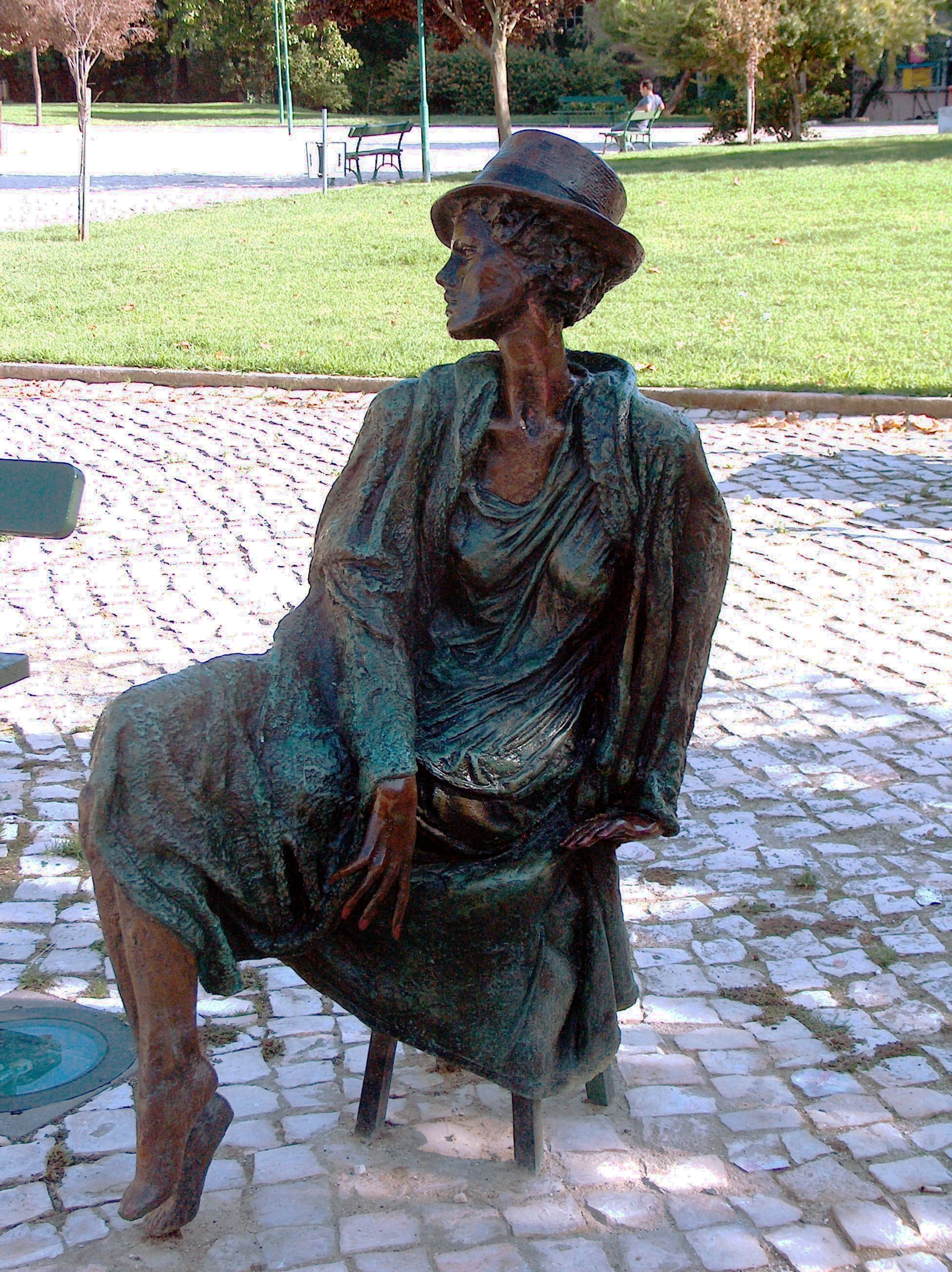
The Family bronze sculpture.

Jorge Melício (Lobito, 20 March 1957) is a Portuguese sculptor. He was born in Angola in 1957 and has lived in Lisbon since he was seven years of age.

== Biography ==
He went to Escola de Artes Decorativas António Arroio ("António Arroio School of Decorative Arts") and Escola Superior de Belas-Artes de Lisboa ("University of Arts of Lisbon").

== Artworks ==
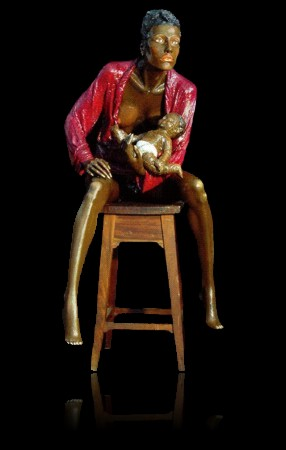
Mother with child, bronze.

In the 1970s he made clay and stone sculptures in the Freguesia of Pêro Pinheiro.

His works are held in numerous museums and private collections. He has a painting in the A Brasileira, Chiado. His public sculptures are found around Portugal. Examples are the "Família" in Fernando Pessoa Garden, near the Lisbon city hall, and the recent ceramic monument dedicated to the life and work of Queen Saint Elizabeth of Portugal, at the headquarters of the Caixa Geral de Depósitos bank in the same city. The administration of the Lisbon metropolitan railway selected him to decorate one of its stations.

== Prizes ==
- Bronze Medal from the Diogo Gonçalves Museum (Portimão)
- Prize: Design ICS Para Embalagens (Milan)
- Silver Medal (Castelo Branco)

== See also ==
- Hyperrealism, a genre of painting and sculpture
- Bronze sculpture, the use of bronze for artistic representations
- Bronzing, a process by which an object is coated in bronze
