= Blind contour drawing =

Drawing the outline of the subject without looking at the paper

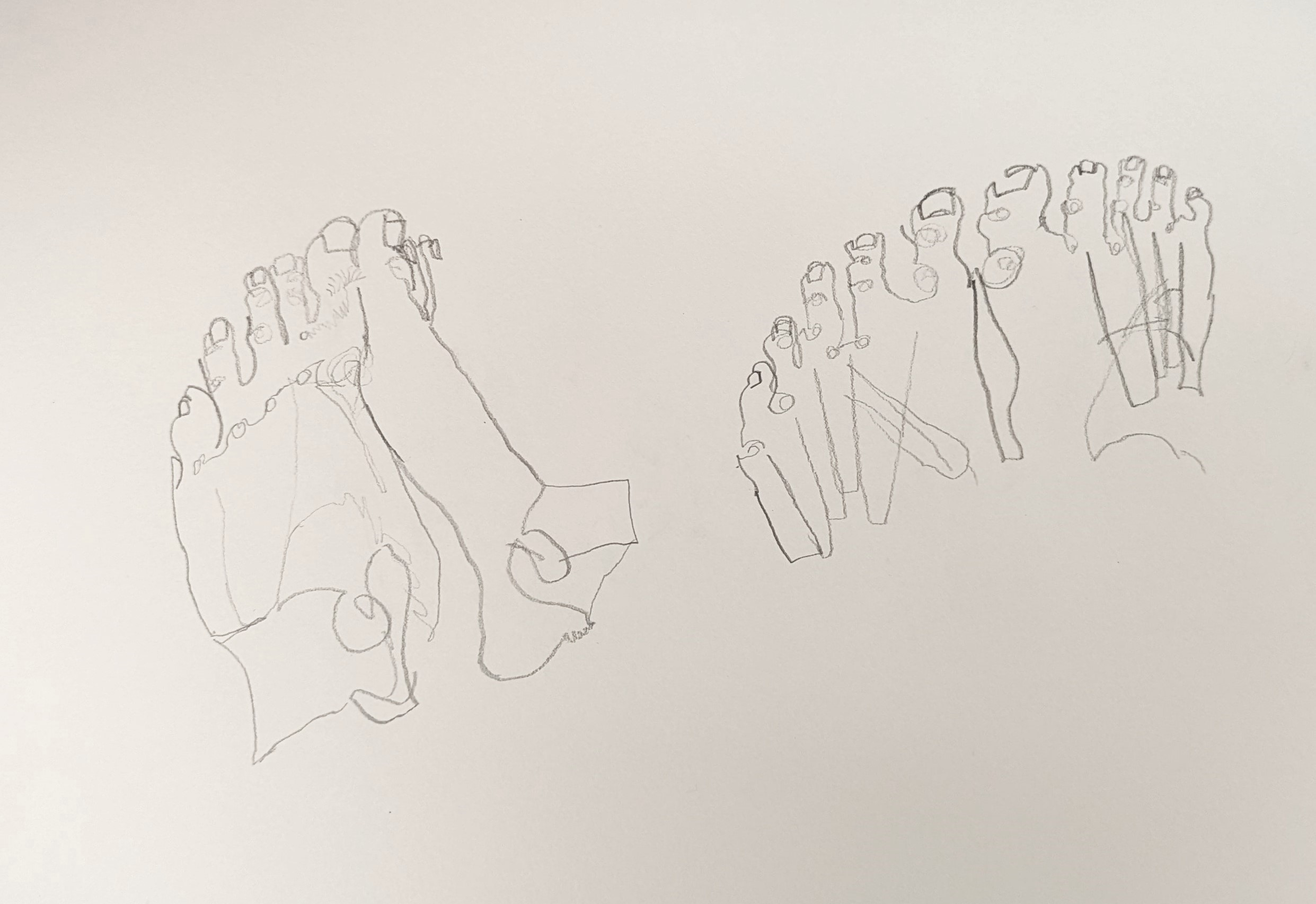
Blind Contour Drawing of Feet, by M. Gunn

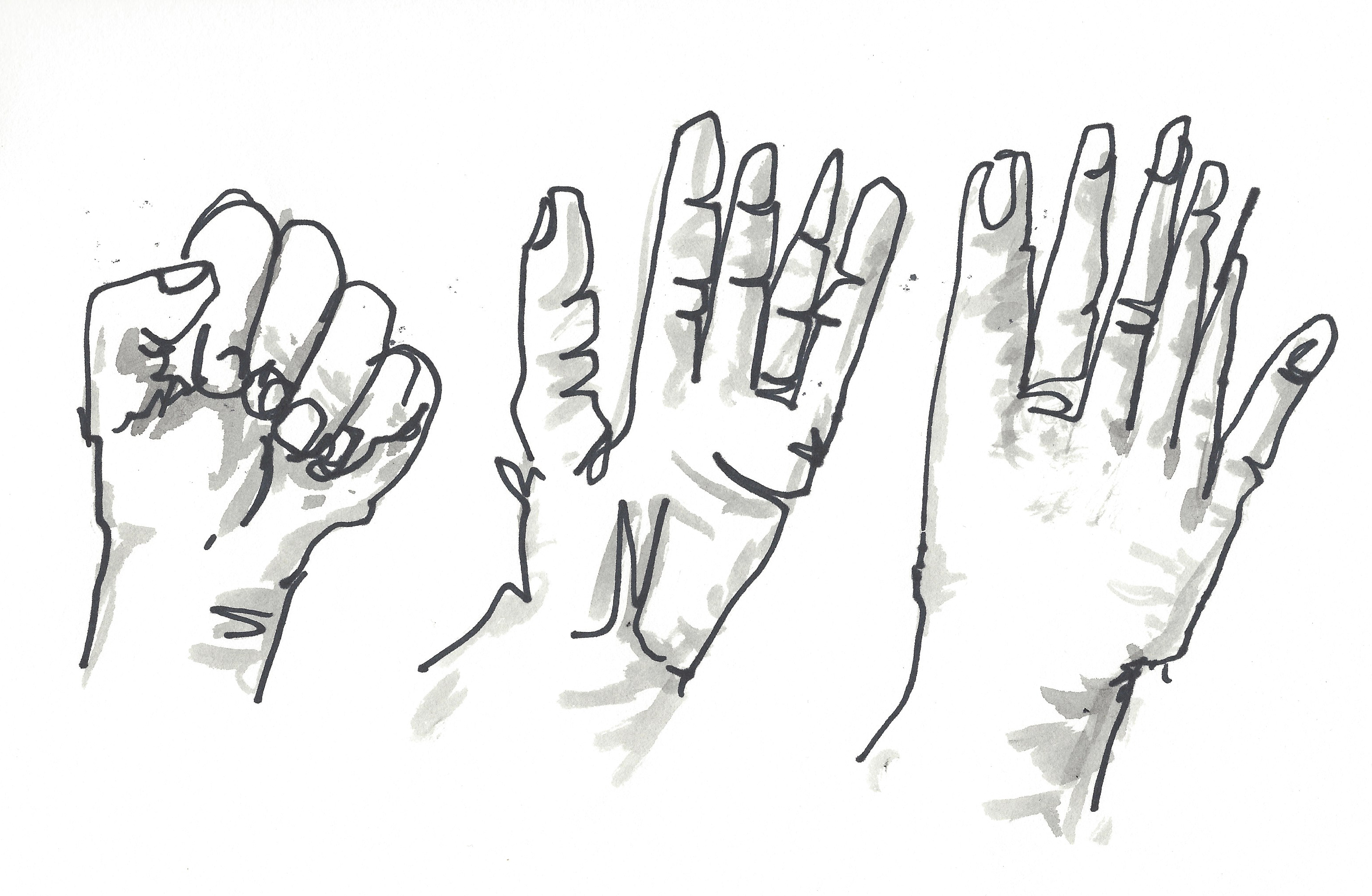

Blind contour drawing is a drawing exercise, where an artist draws the contour of a subject without looking at the paper. The artistic technique was introduced by Kimon Nicolaïdes in The Natural Way to Draw, and it is further popularized by Betty Edwards as "pure contour drawing" in The New Drawing on the Right Side of the Brain.

== Technique ==
The student fixes their eyes on the outline of the model or object, then tracks the edge of the object with their eyes, while simultaneously drawing the contour very slowly, in a steady, continuous line without lifting the pencil or looking at the paper.

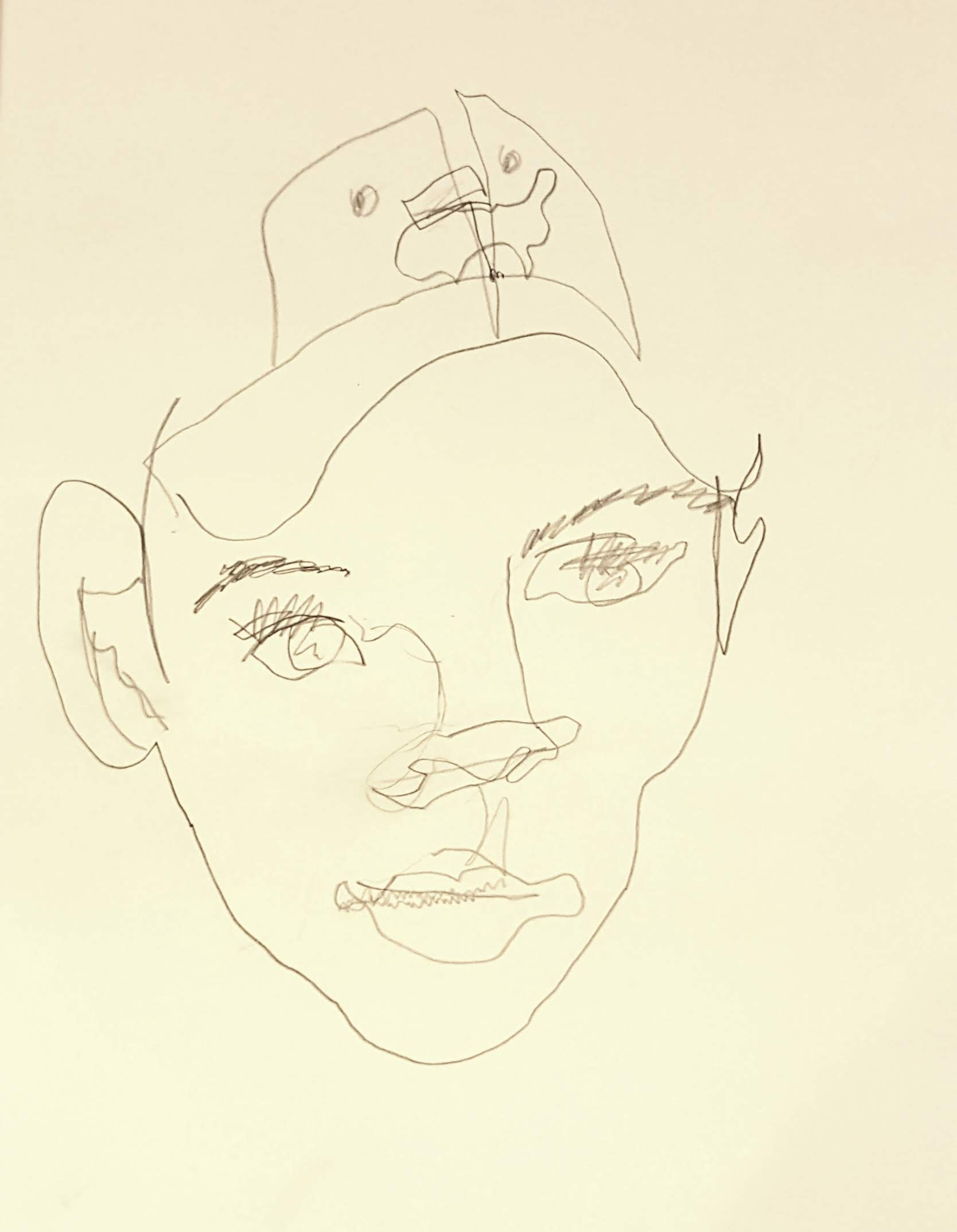
Blind Contour Drawing of a Young Man's Face by J.D. Cabe

== Importance ==
Nicolaïdes and Edwards propose different ideas of why blind contour drawing is an important method of drawing for art students. Nicolaïdes instructs students to keep the belief that the pencil point is actually touching the contour. He suggested that the technique improves students' drawings because it causes students to use both senses of sight and touch. Edwards suggests that pure contour drawing creates a shift from left mode to right mode thinking. The left mode of the brain rejects meticulous, complex perception of spatial and relational information, consequently permitting the right brain to take over. Blind contour drawing may not produce a lifelike drawing; however, it helps students to draw more realistically, rather than relying on their memorized drawing symbols. Blind contour drawing trains the eye and hand to work as a team, and it helps students to see all of the details of the object.

Some artists use contour drawing to warm up for a drawing session.
