= Gesture drawing =

Drawing technique for capturing the position of human figures

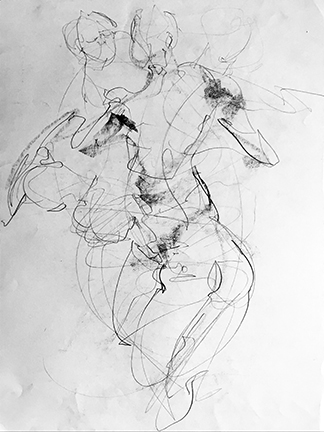
Gesture drawing of a live model (two poses on the same page)

A gesture drawing is a laying in of the action, form, and pose of a model/figure. Typical situations involve an artist drawing a series of poses taken by a model in a short amount of time, often as little as 10 seconds, or as long as 5 minutes. Gesture drawing is often performed as a warm-up for a life drawing session, but is a skill that may be cultivated for its own sake.

In less typical cases the artist may be observing people or animals going about normal activities with no special effort to pause for the artist. For example, drawing from people on the street, performers, athletes, or drawing animals at the zoo.

== Purpose ==
The primary purpose of gesture drawing is to facilitate the study of the human figure in motion. This exploration of action is helpful for the artist to better understand the exertions of muscles, the effects of twisting on the body, and the natural range of motion in the joints. Essentially, it is a method of training hands to sketch what the brain has already seen. Staying "focused" means sustained concentration. Gesture drawings may take as long as two minutes, or as short as five seconds, depending on the focus of the exercise.

The practice allows an artist to draw strenuous or spontaneous poses that cannot be held by the model long enough for an elaborate study and reinforces the importance of movement, action, and direction, which can be overlooked during a long drawing. Thus, an approach is encouraged which notes basic lines of rhythm within the figure. The rapidity of execution suggests an aesthetic which is most concerned with the essence of the pose, and an economy of means in its representation, rather than a careful study of modeling of light on the form.

For some artists, there is a calisthenic logic: just as an athlete warms up before exercising or participating in sports, artists use gesture drawing to prepare themselves mentally and physically for a figure drawing session. The fast pace of gesture poses helps an artist "loosen up" to avoid a stiff drawing style.

Artists who undertake drawing receive the benefits of self-training their drawing ability. Through the act of repetition, the manner of very rapid drawing of the figure can builds an instinctive understanding of human proportions which aids the artist when executing more extended works.

For some artists, a gesture drawing is the first step in preparing a more sustained work. Other artists, who seek to capture brief moments of time in a direct manner, consider the gesture drawing to be the end product.

Drawing from life is often preferred over photographic reference as it allows the artist to view the model from multiple angles and without distortion of the lens or lighting. Additionally, the repetition of short drawings without pausing forces the artist to work intuitively.

Drawings longer than two minutes are usually not considered gestures, as they inevitably grant the artist more time to measure and plan the drawing, or to begin to define the form with modeling. Once the artist begins measuring, erasing, or otherwise improving the drawing, they have ceased to gesture-draw and begun rendering. They will be improving the complexity of their current drawing, but they are no longer practicing their ability to draw correctly from an instant impression.

== See also ==
- Croquis
- Blind contour drawing
