= Conté =

Drawing medium

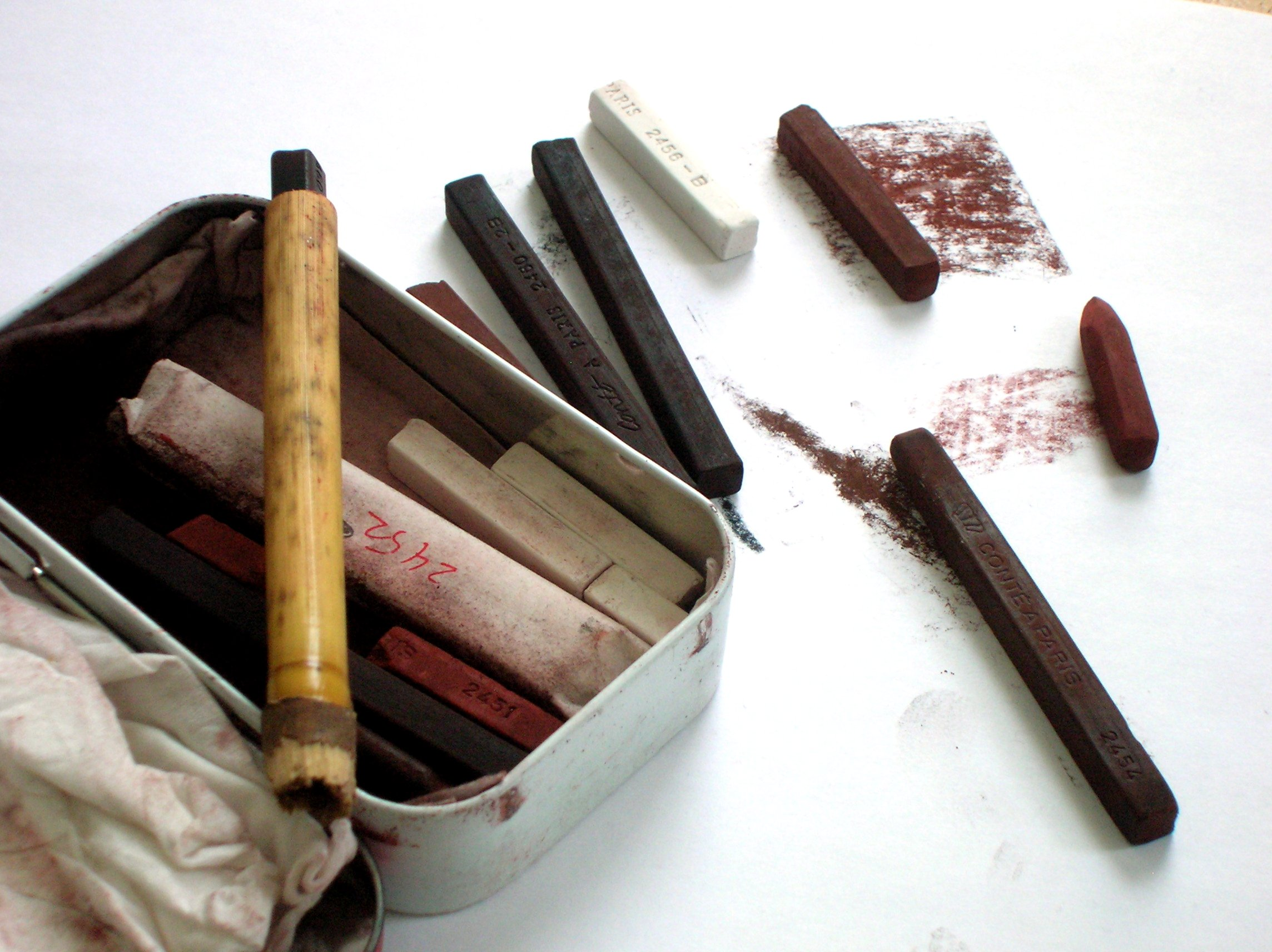
Conté crayons

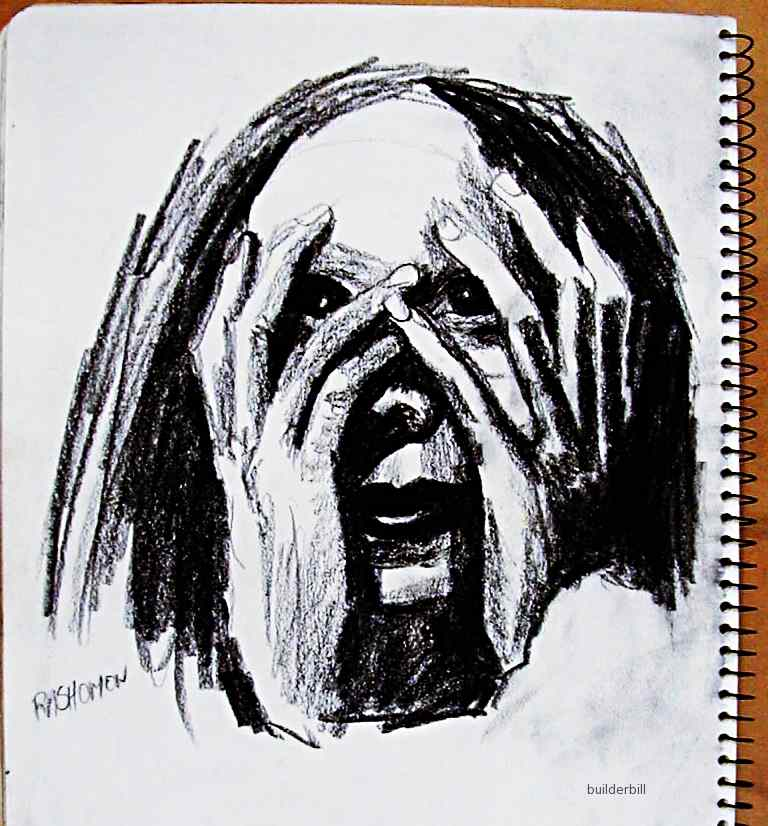
Page from a sketchbook using black Conté

Conté (/ˈkɒnteɪ, -ti/; French: [kɔ̃te]), also called the Conté stick or Conté crayon, is a drawing medium composed of compressed powdered graphite or charcoal mixed with a clay base, square in cross-section. It was invented in 1795 by Nicolas-Jacques Conté, who created the combination of clay and graphite in response to the shortage of graphite caused by the Napoleonic Wars (when the British naval blockade of France prevented import). Conté crayons had the advantage of being cost-effective to produce, and easy to manufacture in controlled grades of hardness.

They are now manufactured using natural pigments (iron oxides, carbon black, titanium dioxide), clay (kaolin), and a binder (cellulose ether).

Conté crayons are most commonly found in black, white, and sanguine tones, as well as bistre, shades of grey, and other colors.

Colors sets are especially useful for field studies and color studies. Some artists create entire paintings with them, using them more like pastels than like a drawing medium. They are also used often to sketch under pastel paintings or lay down initial layers before using dry pastels. Colors can be layered to produce different hues or values. Color Conté mixes better on paper than many hard pastel products.

They are frequently used on rough paper that holds pigment grains well. They can also be used on prepared primed canvases for underdrawing for a painting. Conté crayons are hard and have square edges, making them more suitable for detailed hatched work as opposed to the bolder painterly drawing style demanded by soft pastels.

== Georges Seurat ==
In the 1880s, Georges Seurat used Conté crayons to produce many of his studies.

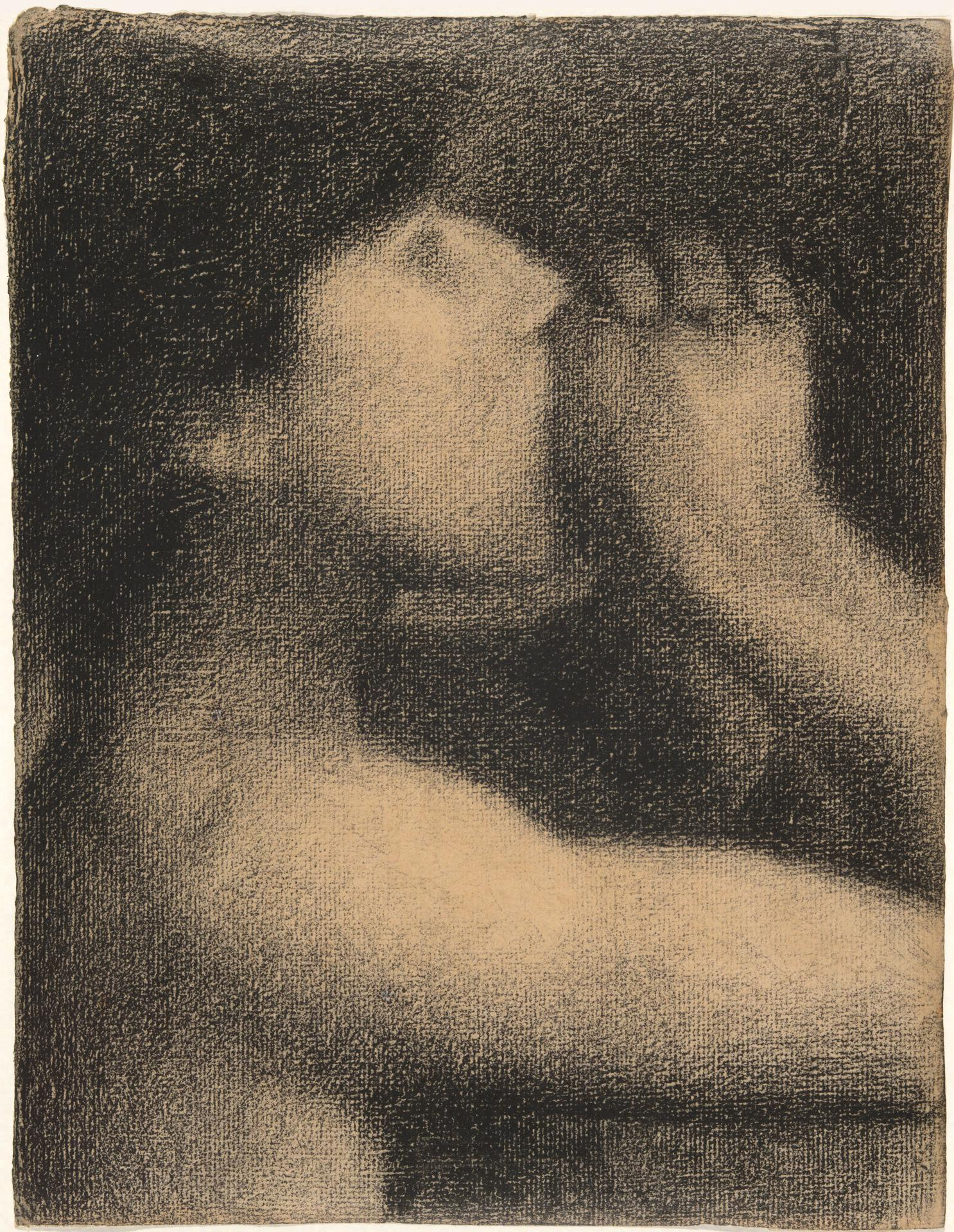
L'Écho, study for Bathers at Asnières

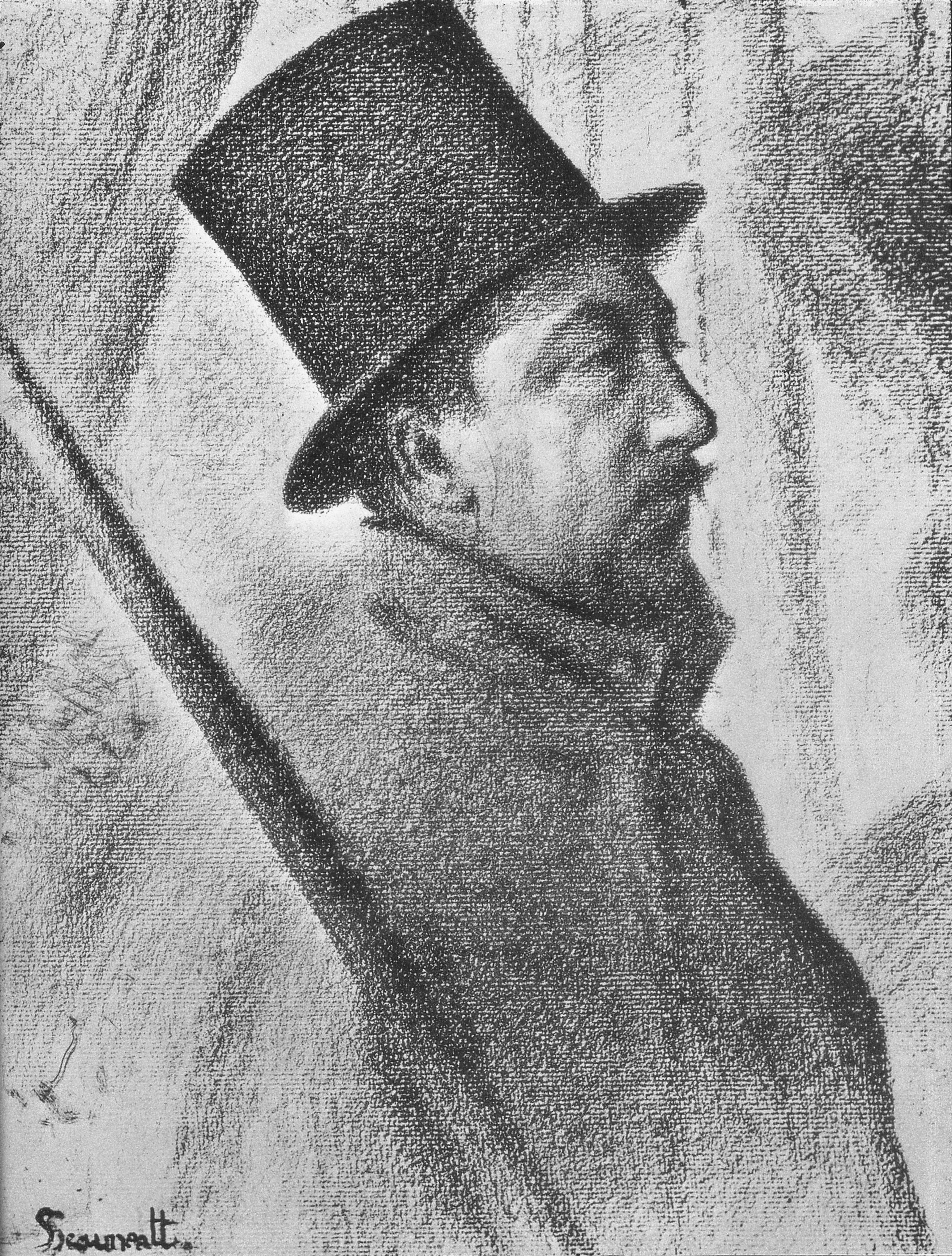
Portrait of Paul Signac

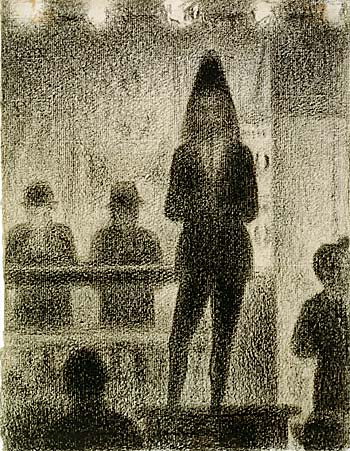
Trombone player, study for Circus Sideshow

== See also ==
- List of art media
- Tortillon
- Trois crayons
