= Croquis =

Quick sketch of a live model

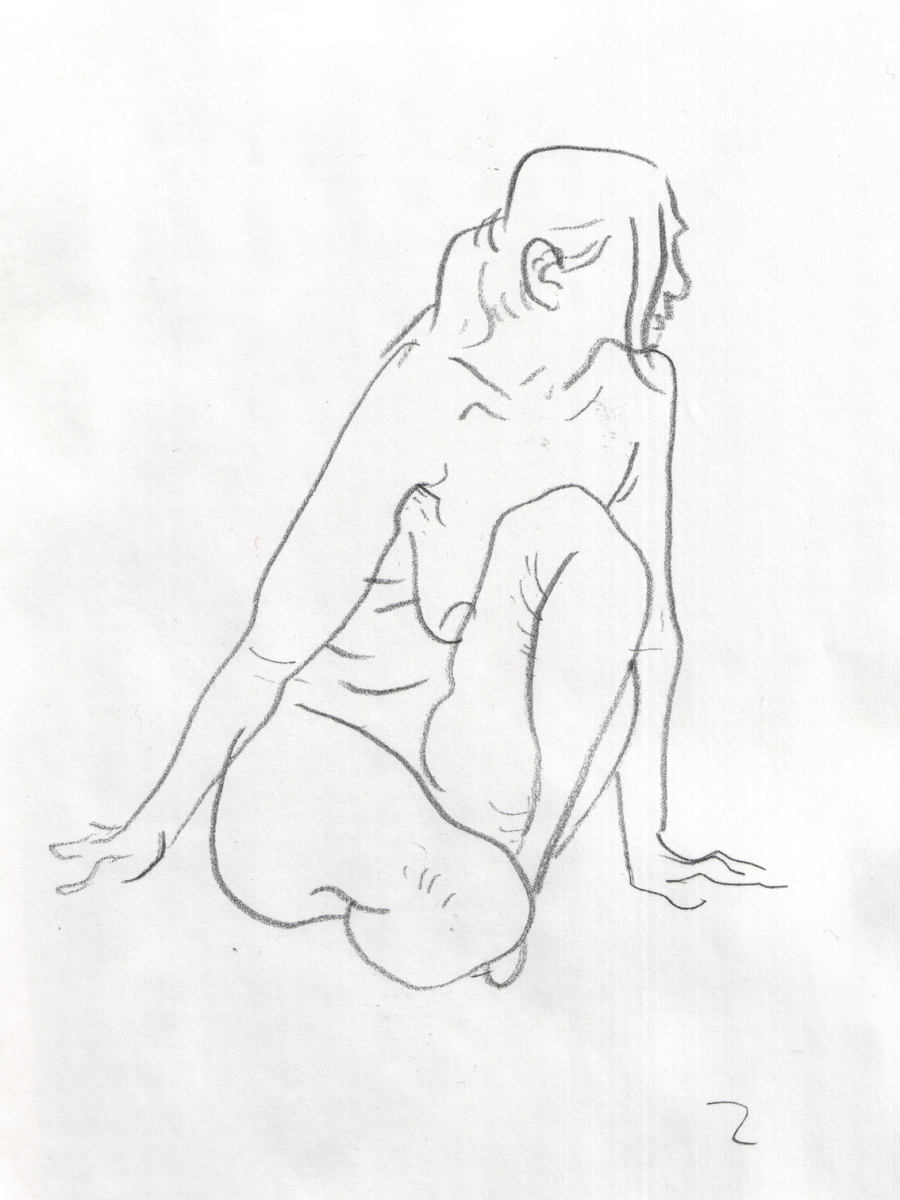
Croquis drawing of a woman

Croquis drawing is quick and sketchy drawing, usually of a live nude model. Croquis drawings are usually made in a few minutes, after which the model changes pose or leaves and another croquis is drawn. The word croquis comes from French and means simply "sketch". In clothing design, a croquis is an outline silhouette, for use by a designer.

After the initial sketch, a croquis drawing can be used as a foundation for another work of art such as a painting, or it may be used as a work of art itself.

== Advantages ==
The short duration of the pose benefits models because they do not need to keep still for a long time. This also benefits the artists because it helps them concentrate on the essential elements of the pose, or the most important parts of the drawing. An artist does not have time to draw all the details, so they learn to concentrate on the important elements. Croquis is also a good method of drawing subjects that generally do not stand still and pose, such as insects, animals, and children.

== In fashion design ==
In fashion, the term refers to a quick sketch of a figure (typically nine heads tall as this is the accepted proportion for fashion illustration) with a loose drawing of the clothes that are being designed. Often a large number of croquis drawings will be created for one finished look, which is fully drawn and finished.
