= Contour drawing =

Art technique; sketching the outlined shape of the subject

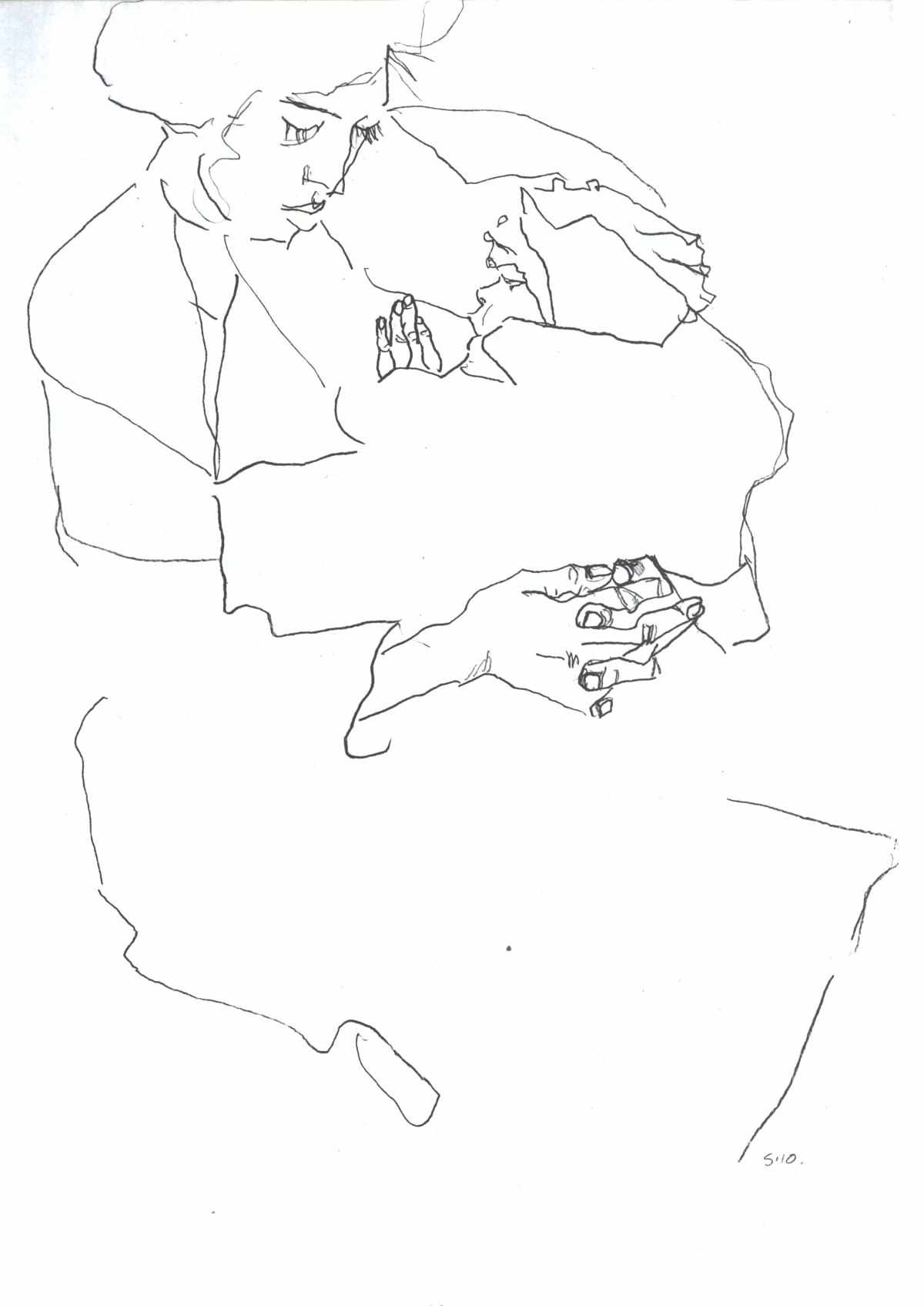
A contour drawing by Egon Schiele

Contour drawing is an art technique in which the artist sketches the style of the subject by drawing lines that result in a drawing that is essentially an outline (the French word contour meaning "outline"). The purpose of contour drawing is to emphasize the mass and volume of the subject rather than the detail; the focus is on the outlined shape of the subject and not the minor details. However, because contour can convey a three-dimensional perspective, length and width as well as thickness and depth are important; not all contours exist along the outlines of a subject. This technique is manifested in different styles and practiced in drawing development and learning.

== Importance ==
Contour drawing is an essential technique in the field of art because it is a strong foundation for any drawing or painting; it can potentially modify a subjects’ form through variation within the lines. It is widely accepted among schools, art institutions, and colleges as an effective training aid and discipline for beginner artists. In the hands of a talented master, the line that conveys contour can deliver an astonishing amount of visual delight.

== Technique ==
In a continuous-line drawing, the artist looks both at the subject and the paper, moving the medium over the paper, and creating a silhouette of the object. Like blind contour drawing, contour drawing is an artful experience that relies more on sensation than perception; it's important to be guided by instinct. To make a blind contour drawing, an artist does not look at the paper or canvas on which they are working. Another technique similar to contour drawing is outline drawing; a division between form and the space a subject occupies. All three types of drawing are considered to be gesture drawings; the practice of drawing a series of bodies in still form. An outline drawing does not include the visual amusement of human sight, while a contour drawing contains form, weight, mass, space, and distance.

== Styles ==
By altering the character of the mark, an artist can emulate many aspects of the subject that relate form and space to the viewer. For example, a line can be lighter in value (gradation) to suggest greater distance between objects in the drawing. A darker portion of the contour could represent an object with little or no light source; the space is compressed or the object is lower. Continuous lines used inside the outline of a subject can add accent or cast shadow, depending on the value of the line.

== Practice ==
The purpose of drawing blindly is to force the artist's eye to move along the contour of the subject as their pencil moves along the paper. Initially, this type of drawing may be difficult and slow, but an artist will find that with practice, it is an effective way of defining observation skills such as identifying and underlying the structure of the subject, relating forms, and conveying the sensual experience of the subject. Through thorough practice in this style, they will be skilled at drawing anything quickly and successively.

== See also ==
- Blind contour drawing
