= Negro (disambiguation) =

Negro is a historic term for people of black African ancestry or appearance.

Negro may also refer to:

== Places ==
- Negro Butte, California, US
- Rio Negro (disambiguation), various rivers and other entities, including those named Negro River
- Negro Creek (disambiguation)
- Negro Hill (disambiguation)
- Negro Lakes, a lake in Wisconsin, US
- Negro Mountain, Pennsylvania and Maryland, United States
- Negro Run (disambiguation)
- Negro Wash, a stream in Arizona, US

== People ==
- Negro (surname)

=== Stage name, ring name or nickname ===
- Il Negro, nickname of Cara Mehmed (c. 1723–1749), Ottoman rebel slave
- A Negro, BA. pen name of Christian Cole (1852–1885), Sierra Leonean lawyer
- Negro Piñera, nickname of Miguel Piñera (1954–2025), Chilean celebrity
- J. Walter Negro, stage name of Ali (1956–1994), American artist and musician
- Negro Casas (born 1960), Mexican professional wrestler
- Joey Negro, stage name of Dave Lee (born 1964), British DJ and producer
- Abismo Negro (Black abyss) (1971–2009), Mexican professional wrestler
- Sin Cara Negro (born 1977), professional wrestler and archenemy of the original Sin Cara
- Mini Abismo Negro (born 1978), Mexican professional wrestler

== Arts and entertainment ==
- The Negro (film), a 2002 Canadian drama film by Robert Morin
- "Negro", a song by J Balvin from Colores, 2020

== Nonfiction ==
- The Negro, a 1915 history by W. E. B. Du Bois
- Negro Anthology, a 1934 anthology edited by Nancy Cunard
- "Negro President": Jefferson and the Slave Power, a 2003 historical study by Garry Wills

== Other uses ==
- HMS Negro, three ships of this name
- Negro (candy), a Hungarian brand of confectionery
- Negro (lead pencil), an artist's drawing medium
- Negro (typeface), a typeface by Lucian Bernhard

== See also ==
- Del Negro, a surname
- El Negro (disambiguation), nickname of several people
- Rio Negro (disambiguation)
- Negros (disambiguation)
- Black (Negro in Spanish)
