= Negro Creek =

Negro Creek may refer to:

- Negro Creek (British Columbia), a stream in British Columbia
- Negro Creek (Tongue Creek), a stream in Colorado
- Negro Creek (Hyco Creek tributary), a stream in Alamance and Caswell Counties, North Carolina
- Negro Creek (South Dakota), a stream in South Dakota
- Negro Creek (Wyoming), a stream in Wyoming
- Negro Creek (Ontario), a stream, road name, and former Black pioneer settlement in Ontario.

== See also ==
- Negro Run (disambiguation)
