= Land of the blacks =

Land of the blacks may refer to the following places:

- Land of the Blacks (Manhattan), an historic area in New York City
- Akal n-Iguinawen (Berber, 'land of black people'), referring to the Guinea region or the Sudan region

== See also ==
- Black Country, in England
- Melanesia, etymologically meaning 'islands of black [people]'
- Negroland, an archaic term in European mapping
- Negros (disambiguation)
- Sudan (derived from the Arabic بلاد السودان bilād as-sūdān 'lands of the blacks')
- Zanzibar, whose etymology ultimately means 'land of the blacks'
