= Del Negro =

Del Negro may refer to:

- Andalò del Negro (c. 1260-1334), mediaeval Italian astronomer
- Vinny Del Negro (born 1966), American basketball player and coach
- Matthew Del Negro (born 1972), American actor
- Del Negro (actor) (1925-2015), Spanish actor

== See also ==
- Negro (disambiguation)
