= Nigger Creek =

Nigger Creek can refer to:

- Crayke Creek, a creek in British Columbia, Canada
- Negro Creek (British Columbia), a creek in British Columbia, Canada, Australian River
