= Negro Lake =

Negro Lake may refer to the following lakes in the United States:

- Negro Lake (Herkimer County, New York)
- Negro Lake, Louisiana, a lake of the United States
- Negro Lakes, Iron County, Wisconsin, now Snowshoe Lakes
