= Dionigi di Borgo San Sepolcro =

Augustinian friar

- Born: 1300
- Died: 31 March 1342 (aged 41–42)
- Other names: Roberti of Roberti, Dennis
- Occupation: Priest
- Known for: Petrarch's confessor

Dionigi di Borgo San Sepolcro OESA (Roberti of Roberti, Dennis) (c. 1300 – 31 March 1342) was an Augustinian friar who was at one time Petrarch's confessor, and who taught Boccaccio at the beginning of his education in the humanities. He was Bishop of Monopoli in Apulia. He was surnamed, not uncommonly for the trecento, for the town in which he was born, now Sansepolcro in Tuscany. His family name was de' Roberti, which no longer exists. Dionigi is the Italian form of Dennis, Latin Dionysius.

== Life ==
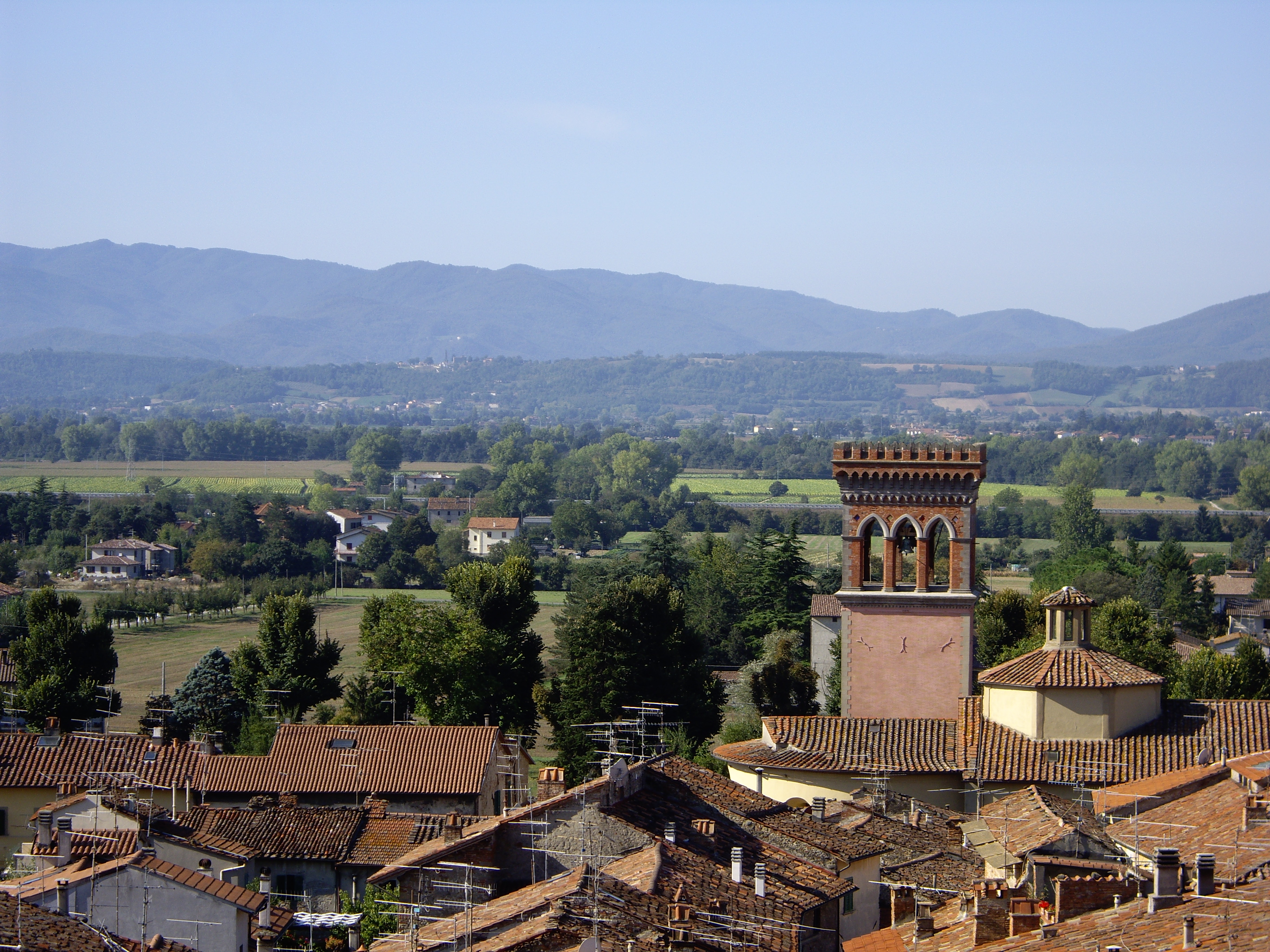
Roofs of Sansepolcro

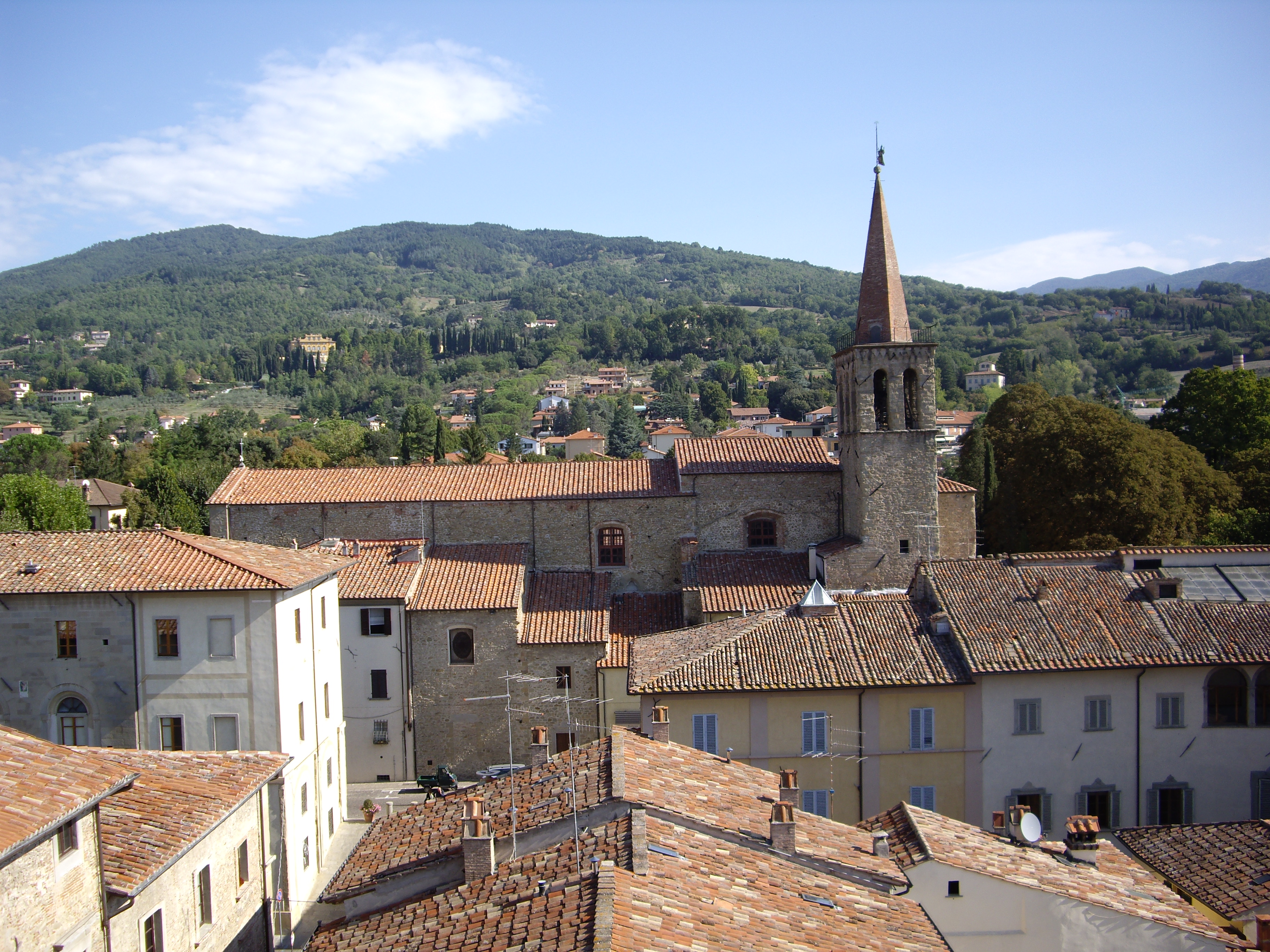
Sansepolcro church

Dionigi joined the Order of Hermits at the Augustinian monastery in Borgo San Sepolcro at an early age. The convent had been founded in 1281 and was located in the valley of Spoleto. He was sent to study theology at the Sorbonne in Paris and graduated baccalaureus sententiarius during the academic year 1317-18. About 1324 he obtained a doctorate in theology and taught at the Sorbonne through 1328. While in Paris, he practised astrology, and predicted the unexpected death of Castruccio Castracani. Giovanni Villani wrote him with the latest news from Italy, deeply concerned about what Castracani and Emperor Louis the Bavarian were about to do; Dionigi wrote back, saying that none of those things would happen, because Castracani was about to die — and he did.

He acquired the ranks of diffinitor and magister sacrae paginae, although these are rarely attested because he may have left the University of Paris. He travelled widely: in 1329 he went on an unspecified diplomatic mission for Cardinal Napoleone Orsini, in 1332 he was in Venice, in 1333 he spent much time in Avignon where he met Petrarch. There he taught at the College which the Augustinians ran, and in 1335 he was in Grasse. In 1337 he went to Florence; in October 1338 he went to Naples, and he remained in that kingdom the rest of his life.

At Naples, he lived in the Augustinian convent, and was witness to a deed gift of land made by the Neapolitan nobleman Walter to build a church in honor of S. Giovanni Battista, executed 11 October 1339. Other intellectuals in Naples at the time include Andalò del Negro, Paolo Minorita, Niccolò Acciaioli, Paolo dell'Abbaco, Paolo da Perugia, Graziolo de' Bambaglioli, and Cino da Pistoia.

He won the favor of King Robert of Naples for his astrology and his classical Latin; as early as the winter of 1338, King Robert appointed him to settle a quarrel among the factions of the citizenry of l'Aquila. On 17 March 1340, he was consecrated bishop of Monopoli, at the King's request. A dispensation for a marriage from him survives dated 5 June 1340 among the correspondence of Pope Benedict XII.

He died on 31 March 1342 and was buried in the local church yard of Agostino alla Zecca. Petrarch wrote his epitaph. (Note: DBI, p.196, col. 1; Branca implies that Dionigi died the previous year, since he dates Boccaccio's letter about his death August 28, 1341. Epitaph: Flere Libet, sed fairs Vetor ..., Epistolae Metricae, I, 13)

== Petrarch ==
Dionigi had been Petrarch's confessor during his stay in Avignon, and Petrarch wrote three letters to him. Much of what we know about Dionigi is inferred from this correspondence; and is correspondingly uncertain. Moschella holds, for example that he was introduced to Petrarch in 1333, by Giacomo Colonna; but there has been other speculation that Petrarch met Dionigi in Paris.

Dionigi recommended Augustine's Confessions to Petrarch, who had never read it; Dionigi gave him a pocket copy, which Petrarch says he carried around with him everywhere. Moschella asserts that Dionigi's influence on Petrarch in his moral crisis over Laura amounted to a conversion.

Petrarch addressed his long account of his ascent of Mont Ventoux to Dionigi. Dionigi was also instrumental in persuading King Robert of Naples to present Petrarch with his crown of laurel: Petrarch had invited Dionigi to visit Vaucluse on his way to Naples in 1338, in a verse letter filled with flattery of the King. When Dionigi arrived in Naples, he did persuade King Robert to write Petrarch, and Petrarch responded to both of them, congratulating Dionigi on having the favor of so famous a king, and reminding him in a postscript: "You know what I think about the laurel."

Dionigi also arranged Petrarch's visit to Naples in February 1341, when King Robert examined him for his fitness for the laurel.

== Boccaccio ==
Giovanni Boccaccio had lived in Naples, and been welcome in the court of King Robert, since 1327, when he was fourteen. He returned to Florence, probably at the end of 1340, and wrote a letter there, bemoaning the death of his "reverend father and teacher", Dionigi; whose death "left nothing for him in the world." Dionigi had introduced him to the works of Augustine, Seneca, and Petrarch; Branca presumes that he had also taught him vernacular poetry and rhymed prose.

== Works ==
Most of Dionigi's writings are lost; but we have

- A commentary on the first book of Peter Lombard's Sententiae (on which, as was common, he had given his baccalaureate lecture)
- a treatise on logic (Compendiuni logicae juxta Doctrinam em ac funds),
- a commentary on Aristotle's Economics,
- a commentary on Valerius Maximus (printed in Strasbourg in the 1470s).

Some other commentaries have been attributed to Dionigi.

== Bibliography ==
=== References ===
- (in Italian) Maurizio Moschella, "Dionigi da Borgo Sansepolcro", Dizionario Biografico degli Italiani (DBI), Vol. 40, pp. 194–197.
- Morris Bishop, Petrarch and his World, Indiana University Press, 1963.
- Vittore Branca, Boccaccio : the man and his works, translated by Richard Monges; cotranslator and editor Dennis J. McAuliffe; New York University 1976. (A collected and revised version of Branca's Boccaccio Medievale, of 1956)
