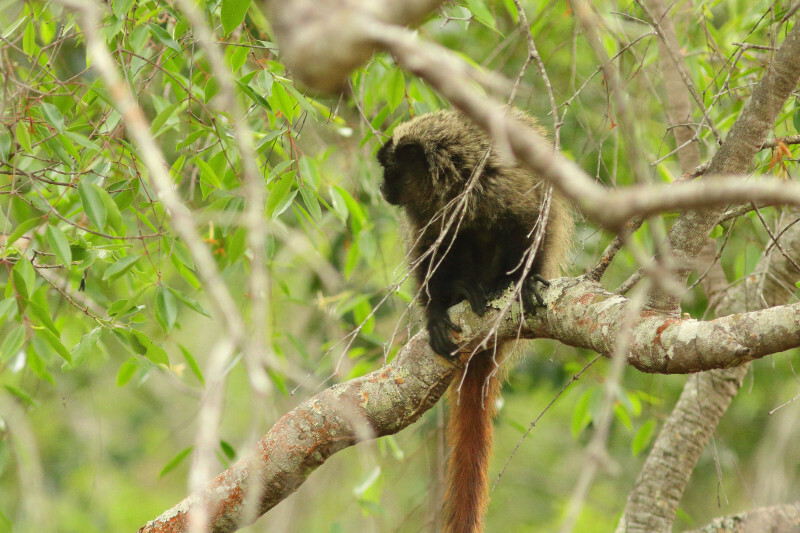

Conservation status
- Critically Endangered (IUCN 3.1)

Scientific classification
- Kingdom: Animalia
- Phylum: Chordata
- Class: Mammalia
- Infraclass: Placentalia
- Order: Primates
- Family: Pitheciidae
- Genus: Callicebus
- Species: C. barbarabrownae

Binomial name
- Callicebus barbarabrownae (Hershkovitz, 1990)
- Geographic range

= Barbara Brown's titi monkey =

Barbara Brown's titi

Species of New World monkey

Barbara Brown's titi monkey (Callicebus barbarabrownae), also popularly known as the blond titi monkey or northern Bahian blond titi, is a species of titi, a type of New World monkey. This critically endangered species is endemic to the Caatinga in northeastern Brazil, and it is estimated that less than 250 mature individuals remain. It is named after the zoologist Barbara Elaine Russell Brown.

== Home range ==
The blonde titi monkey is listed as Critically Endangered due to small population size. The blond titi monkey is endemic to the Atlantic forests of eastern Brazil, where it is found in the coastal highlands of Bahia and Sergipe States. Most of its population is found between the Paraguaçu River (north) and Salvador (south), and west towards Mirorós. The estimated population is 260 individuals and is decreasing.

C. barbarabrownae has been listed among the World's 25 Most Endangered Primates in 2012.

== Habitat and ecology ==
The blond titi prefers habitats in caatinga, a dry scrubland, specifically those that are dense and feature trees. They display arboreal tendencies, rarely descending to the ground. They are small in size and are agile primates, good climbers who utilize all four limbs. They use their rear limbs to jump long distances, and their leading forehands to grasp onto branches. While resting, they hunch their body, hanging the tail over a branch.

== Biology ==
The titi monkeys are most active at dawn and dusk foraging for fruits, leaves, and insects, resting at midday. The males will lead the group while foraging, communicating to the rest of the group with a wide array of vocalizations and visual signals. Titi monkeys are monogamous, with groups consisting of strongly-bonded parents and their offspring. Partners often reinforce the pair bond by perching side by side and entwining their tails.

Females give birth annually during the wet season, to a litter of just one, after a gestation period of five to six months. Juveniles grow rapidly to reach adult size within ten months.

== Major threats ==
The blond titi's Brazilian habitat is subject to widespread deforestation and habitat fragmentation. Cattle ranching, agriculture, and continuing urbanization are the main threats, with the area in rapid development facilitated by an extensive network of highways. Other threats include potential dangers from roads and power-lines and predation by domestic pets. This species is often found in small, fragmented populations that are exposed to synergistic genetic and demographic risks. Hunting pressure needs to be ascertained, but it is likely moderate due to the small body size. During surveys, a few individuals were found being kept as pets. The species is not found in any officially protected area.

== Conservation ==
Despite being home to numerous species found nowhere else in the world, only one percent of the forests of Bahia are under any form of protection. As a number of destructive activities continue to degrade the area, action is required to protect the habitat of the blond titi monkeys. Several organizations, including the Brazilian Institute for the Environment, are working to promote the study and protection of Brazil's threatened primates. Conservation International is also helping to establish a Central Biodiversity Corridor that aims to connect fragmented forests, while WWF is developing an overall conservation strategy for Brazil's Atlantic forests. Further research is needed into the ecology and status of this enigmatic species if it is to be pulled back from the brink of extinction.
