= Isothrix barbarabrownae =

Scientific classification
- Kingdom: Animalia
- Phylum: Chordata
- Class: Mammalia
- Order: Rodentia
- Family: Echimyidae
- Genus: Isothrix
- Species: I. barbarabrownae

Binomial name
- Isothrix barbarabrownae Patterson & Velazco, 2006
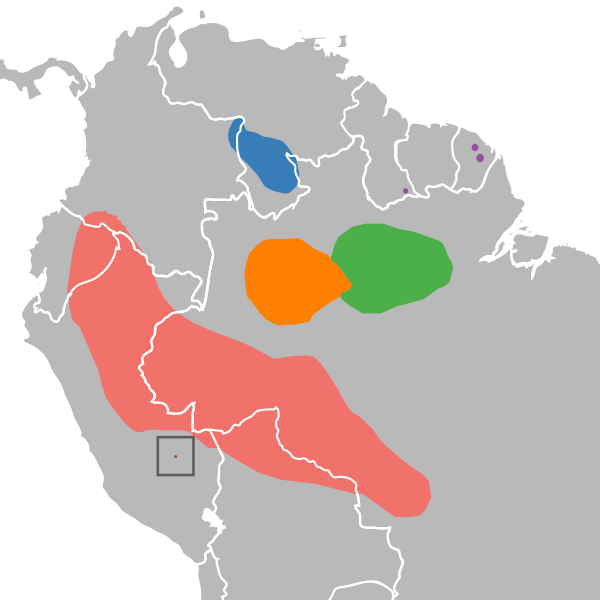
- Isothrix distribution I. barbarabrownae in brown (in box)

Species of rodent

Isothrix barbarabrownae is a recently discovered species of rodents of the spiny rat family Echimyidae.

== Discovery ==
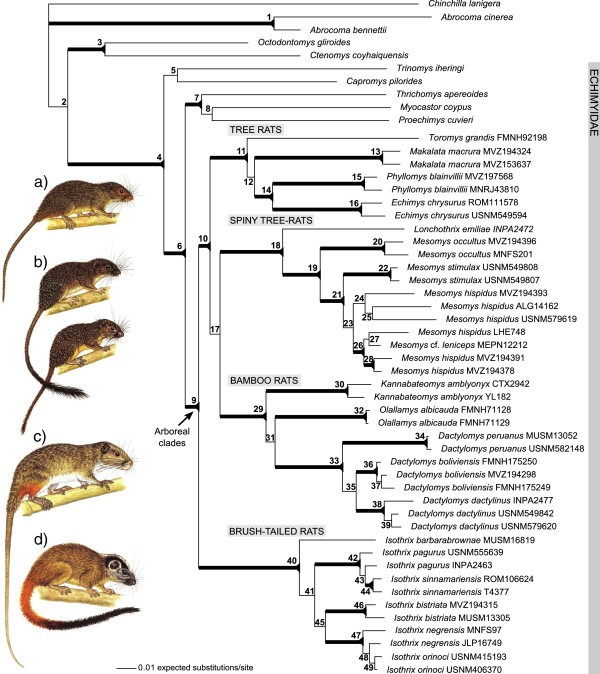
Family tree of spiny rats

It was discovered in Peru, and is about the same size as a large squirrel, such as a Eurasian red squirrel. It is brown, with a black-and-white tail. It inhabits the Peruvian cloud forest, where it forages for fruit and nuts. It is a nocturnal, climbing rodent which was collected by scientists in 1999, and formally described in 2006. It is named after the biologist and curator, Barbara Elaine Russell Brown.
