= Vadaravis =

Vadaravis Temporal range: Eocene, 51.97 Ma

Scientific classification
- Kingdom: Animalia
- Phylum: Chordata
- Class: Aves
- Order: Pelecaniformes
- Family: Threskiornithidae
- Genus: †Vadaravis; Smith et al., 2013
- Species: †V. brownae

Binomial name
- †Vadaravis brownae Smith et al., 2013

Extinct genus of birds

Vadaravis is an extinct genus of waterbird from the early Eocene period in North America. It contains a single species, Vadaravis brownae, named after American biologist Barbara Elaine Russell Brown. An almost complete skeleton of the bird, lacking the skull, was found in the sediments of the Green River Formation in Wyoming, United States. It was suggested to have possibly been a close relative of the Threskiornithidae family, which includes ibises and spoonbills.
