= Barbara Elaine Russell Brown =

American biologist and philanthropist (1929–2019)

- Born: February 14, 1929; Chicago, Illinois, U.S.
- Died: January 7, 2019 (aged 89)
- Education: University of Illinois
- Occupations: Zoologist; ornithologist
- Employer: Field Museum of Natural History

Barbara Elaine Russell Brown (February 14, 1929 – January 7, 2019) was an American biologist and philanthropist.

== Early life ==
Brown was born Barbara Russell, on February 14, 1929 in Chicago; her parents were Jewish immigrants from Romania and Russia. She graduated from the University of Illinois Urbana-Champaign with a bachelor's degree in economics after initially attending Rockford College.

== Careers ==
Brown's career began as an assistant to the zoologist Philip Hershkovitz. From 1974, she served the Women's Boards at the Chicago Field Museum of Natural History for 47 years, moving to the Chicago Botanic Garden in 2010. Her research at the Field Museum was concentrated on mammalogy, with an emphasis in New World species. Brown's research involved expeditions to the Cerrado savanna and to the Atlantic coastal forest of Brazil, and she authored an important treatise on marsupials. She was a skilled animal collector, with expertise in preparing specimens and setting traps.

== Personal life ==
In 1953, she married Roger Brown; they went on to have six children together. She moved to Highland Park, IL shortly after marrying, where the couple purchased five acres of undeveloped orchard, woodland, and marsh within the suburb, later adding five more acres to accommodate their children and dogs. Barbara enriched her community by joining the Highland Park Library Board, serving the city's Environmental Commission, as a guide at the Heller Nature Center, and by volunteering at elementary schools and extracurriculars. For decades, she was the president of the North Shore Bird Club, and was an avid birder through the United States, Canada, Australia and Central America.

== Eponyms ==
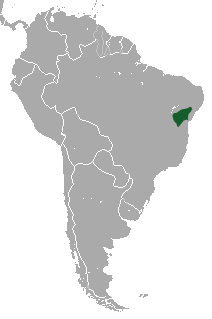
Range of Barbara Brown's Titi

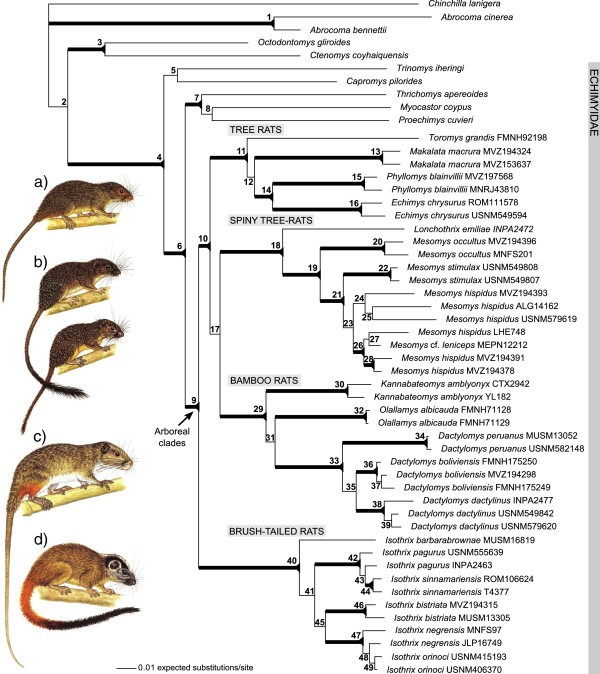
Echimyidae phylogeny – including Isothrix barbarabrownaea

Brown has had four new species named after her. These include:

- Isothrix barbarabrownae – Barbara Brown's Brush-tailed Rat
- Callicebus barbarabrownae – Barbara Brown's titi
- Apomys brownorum – Mount Tapulao forest mouse
- Vadaravis brownae – a Threskiornithidae-like fossil bird

== Philanthropy ==
With her husband Roger Brown, she has philanthropically supported the Field Museum, the Science Museum of Minnesota, and the Chicago Botanic Garden. This endowment included the new post—the Barbara Brown Chair of Ornithology—who directs the Science Museum of Minnesota's new ornithology department.
