= Robinson River (Virginia) =

Tributary of the Rapidan River in Virginia

Coordinates: 38.3115°N 78.0946°W

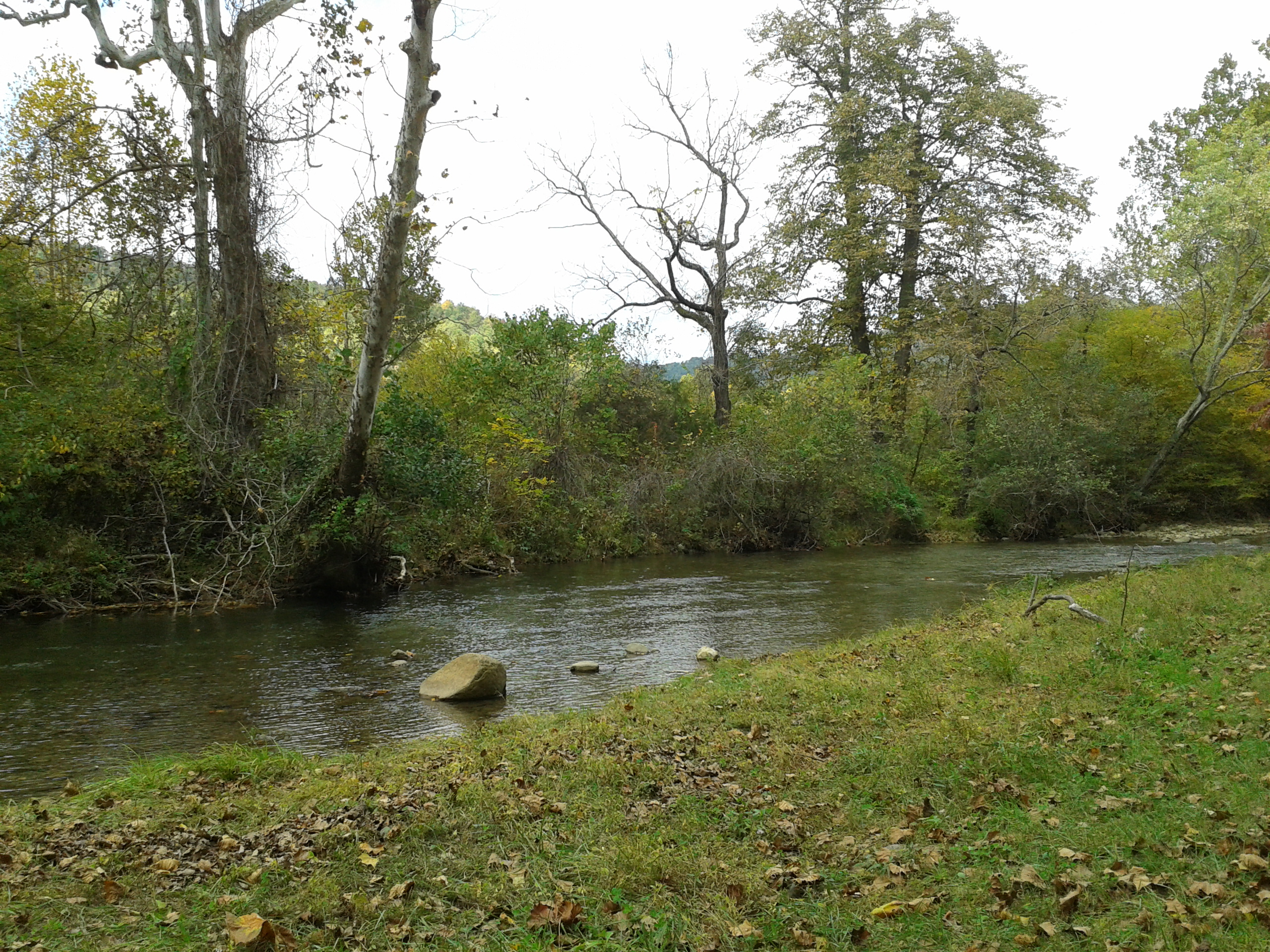
The Robinson River near Syria, Virginia

The Robinson River is a 34.2-mile-long (55.0 km) tributary of the Rapidan River in Madison County, Virginia, in the United States. It flows southeast through White Oak Canyon and Berry Hollow, under Routes 231, 29 and 15. From its start in Shenandoah National Park as Cedar Run and Tims River, it has confluences with the Rose River, Quaker Run, Shotwell Run, Leathers Run, Mulatto Run, White Oak Run, Deep Run, Dark Run, Beaverdam Run and Great Run before its confluence with the Rapidan River. A 19-mile (31 km) section of the Robinson River from Syria to Locust Dale is Class II whitewater, with an average gradient of 15 feet per mile (2.8 m/km). In the Syria area, both the Rose River and Robinson River are stocked with Rainbow trout and Brook trout by the state of Virginia.

== History ==
The Robinson River is mis-marked as the Robertson River on the famous Boye, Bucholtz, Tanner map. However, the Robinson River is referenced in earlier documents, such as those in the Germanna historical archives.

== See also ==
- List of Virginia rivers
