= Rose River (Virginia) =

Coordinates: 38.47301°N 78.31501°W

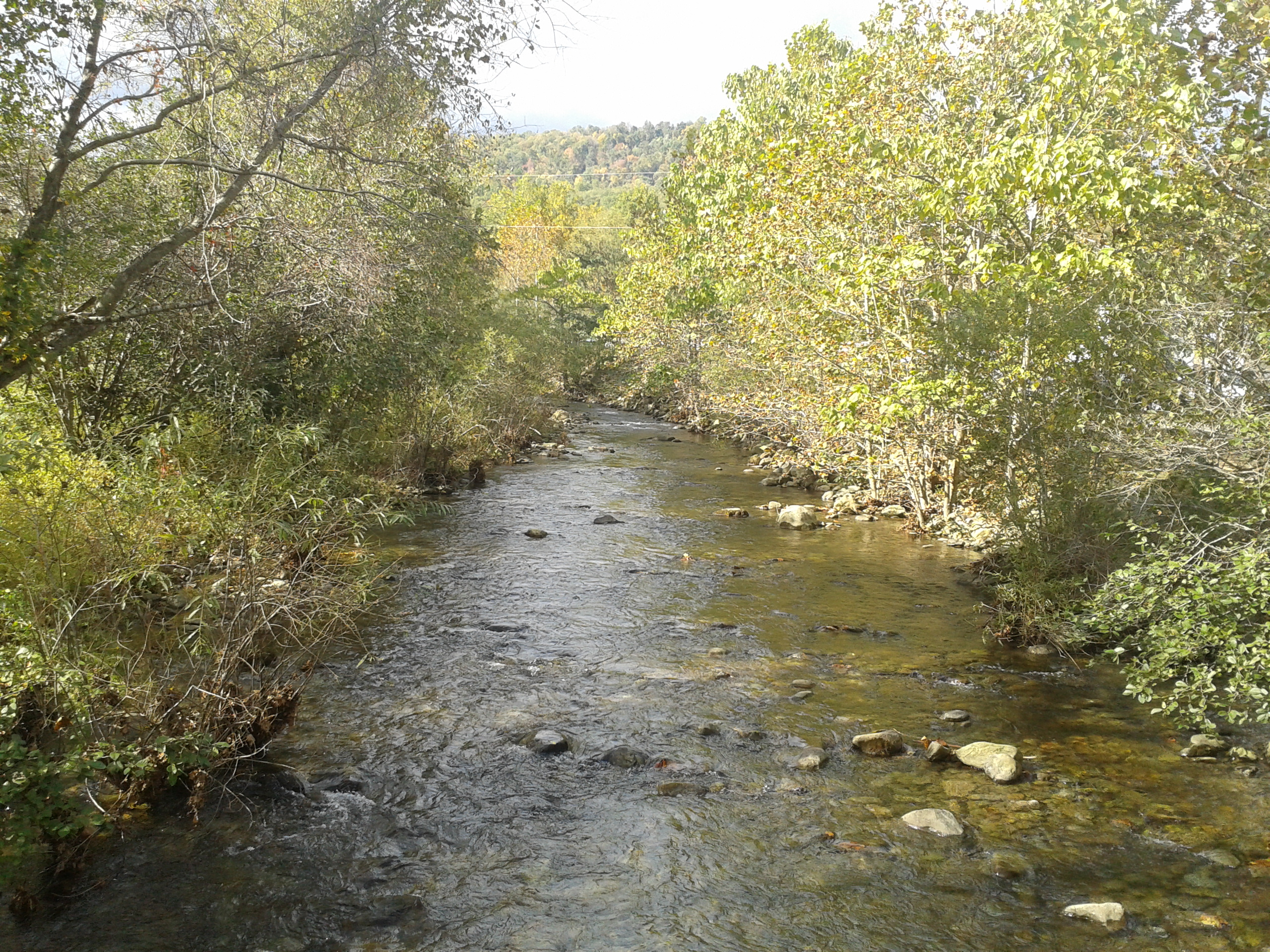
- The Rose River as it passes through the property of Graves Mountain Lodge in Syria, Virginia

Location
- Country: United States

Physical characteristics
- Source
  - location: Virginia

The Rose River is an 8.8-mile-long (14.2 km) river in the U.S. state of Virginia. Rising on the south face of Hawksbill Mountain, the highest point in Shenandoah National Park, the river flows southeast to its junction near Syria, Virginia, with the Robinson River, a tributary of the Rapidan River and part of the Rappahannock River watershed.

== See also ==
- List of rivers of Virginia
