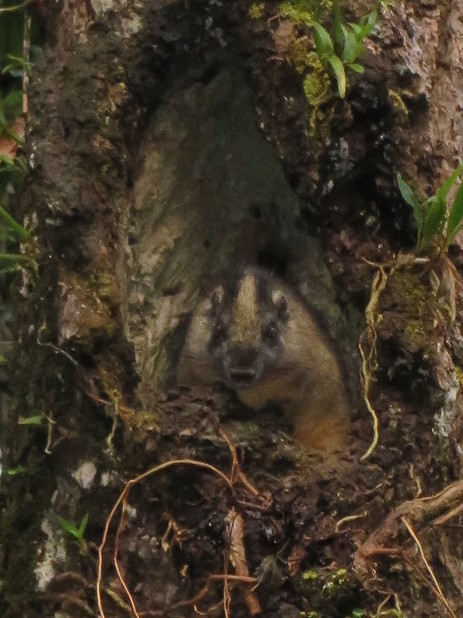

Conservation status
- Least Concern (IUCN 3.1)

Scientific classification
- Kingdom: Animalia
- Phylum: Chordata
- Class: Mammalia
- Order: Rodentia
- Family: Echimyidae
- Subfamily: Echimyinae
- Tribe: Echimyini
- Genus: Isothrix
- Species: I. bistriata

Binomial name
- Isothrix bistriata Wagner, 1845
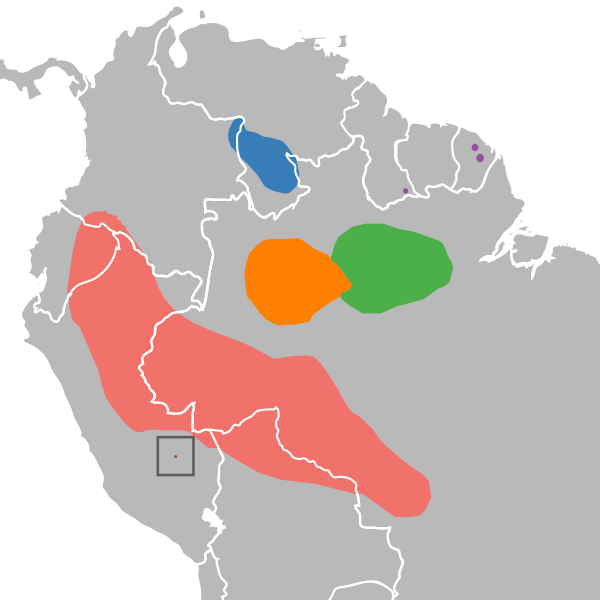
- Isothrix distribution I. bistriata in red

Synonyms
- I. boliviensis Petter & Cuenca Aguirre, 1982; I. molliae Thomas, 1924; I. orinoci Thomas, 1989; I. villosus (Deville, 1852)

= Yellow-crowned brush-tailed rat =

Species of rodent

The yellow-crowned brush-tailed rat (Isothrix bistriata) is a South American species of brush-tailed rat in the family Echimyidae. It is found in Bolivia, Brazil, Colombia, Ecuador, Peru, and Venezuela. They are nocturnal and arboreal animals found in lowland evergreen rainforest, probably restricted to igapó and várzea habitats. Sometimes they can be seen at the entrances of their dens, which are often in tree holes (especially hollow palms) on the borders of rivers.
