= Syria, Virginia =

Unincorporated community in Virginia, United States

Coordinates: 38°29′16″N 78°19′34″W

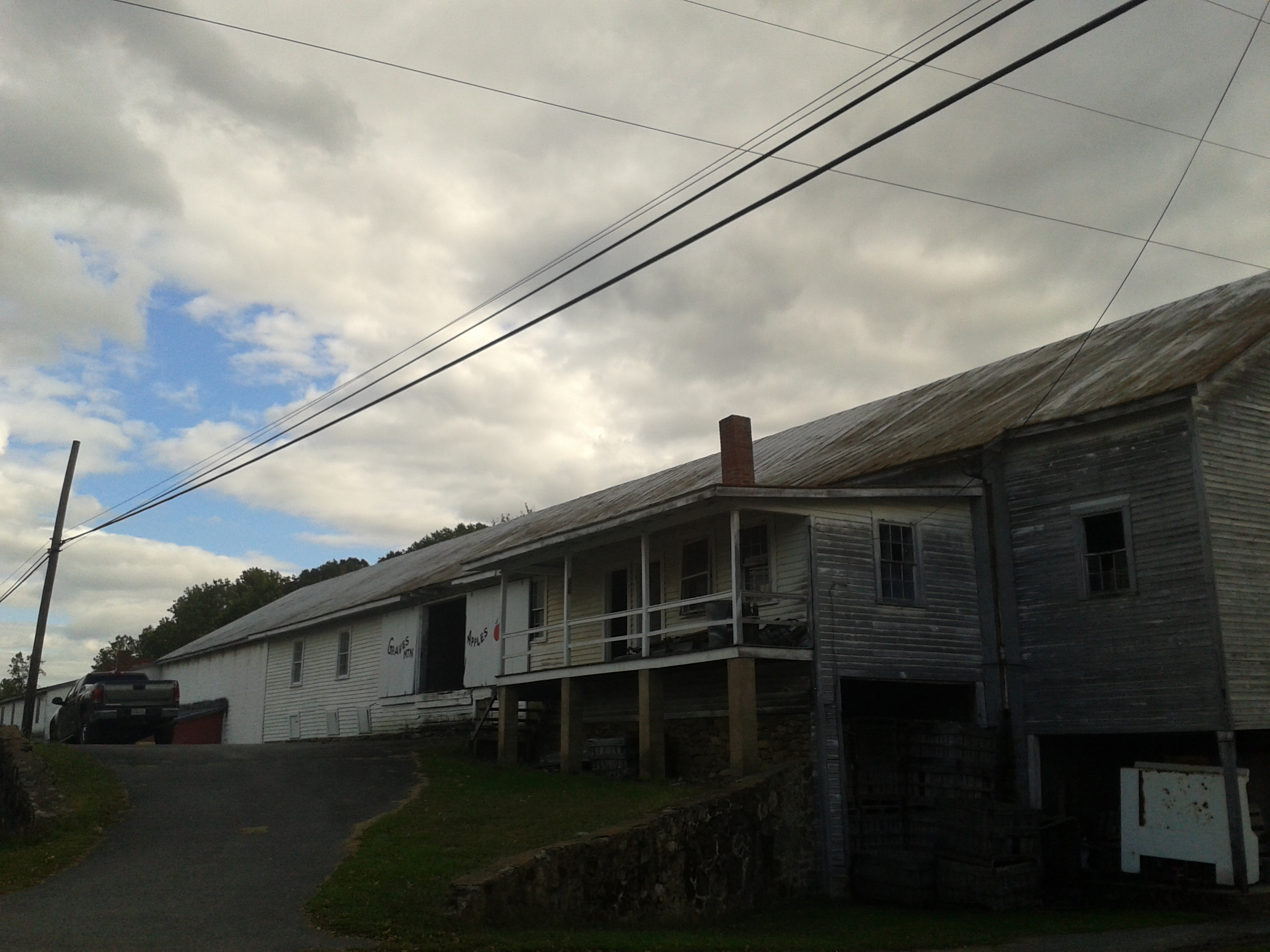
Syria Mercentile

Syria (pronounced: /saɪˈriːə/ sye-REE-ə) is an unincorporated settlement in Madison County, Virginia, in the United States. It lies along the Old Blue Ridge Turnpike (State Route 670), adjoining the southeastern border of the Shenandoah National Park. Its ZIP Code is 22743.

Syria is located east of the Blue Ridge Mountains and near the Rose River and Robinson River confluence.

== History ==
The name "Syria" was first applied to the area in 1898 when the local branch of the United States Postal Service opened under the name the Syria Post Office, the name "Syria" chosen because the region of Syria was named in the Bible.

== Climate ==
The climate in this area is characterized by hot, humid summers and generally mild to cool winters. According to the Köppen Climate Classification system, Syria has a humid subtropical climate, abbreviated "Cfa" on climate maps.

== Events ==
=== Graves Mountain Apple Harvest Festival ===
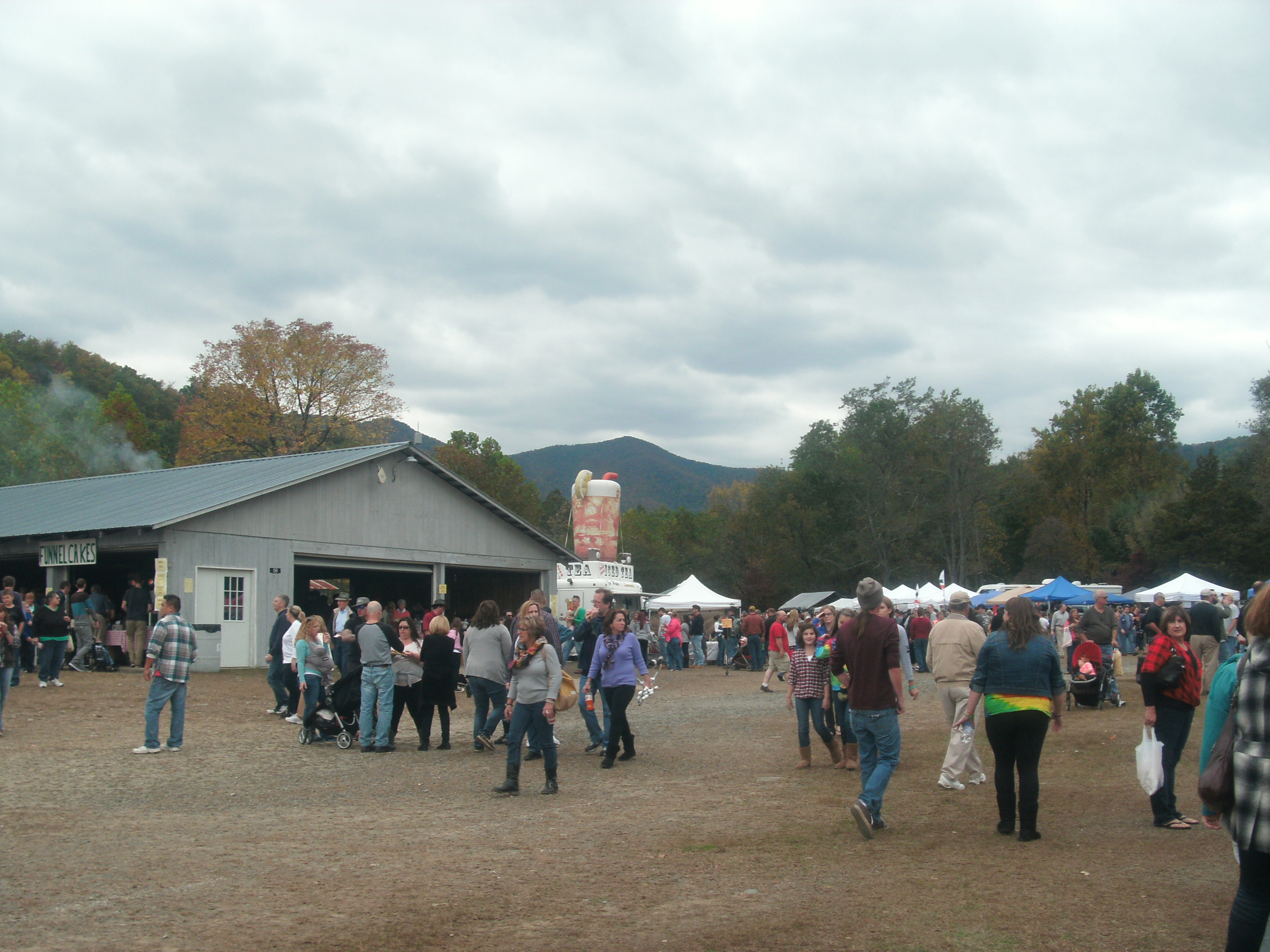
Graves Mountain Apple Harvest Festival in October 2014

The Graves Mountain Apple Harvest Festival is an apple fall harvest that has been hosted the Graves Mountain Lodge campground area since 1970. The festival hosts live music and arts and crafts vendors each year, along with attractions such as hay rides, pony rides, a hay maze, and bouncing houses. It is held on the three weekends of October.

=== Graves Mountain Festival of Music ===
Since 1993, the campground at Graves Mountain Lodge at Route 670 in Syria has hosted the Graves Mountain Festival of Music, a music festival focused on bluegrass music held over three days – Thursday to Saturday – at the end of May/beginning of June.
