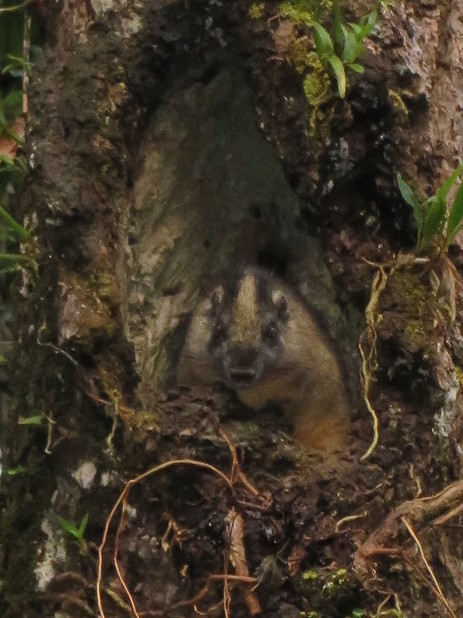
- Isothrix bistriata

Scientific classification
- Kingdom: Animalia
- Phylum: Chordata
- Class: Mammalia
- Infraclass: Placentalia
- Order: Rodentia
- Family: Echimyidae
- Subfamily: Echimyinae
- Tribe: Echimyini
- Genus: Isothrix; Wagner, 1845

Type species
- Isothrix bistriata Wagner, 1845

Species
- I. barbarabrownae I. bistriata I. negrensis I. pagurus I. sinnamariensis
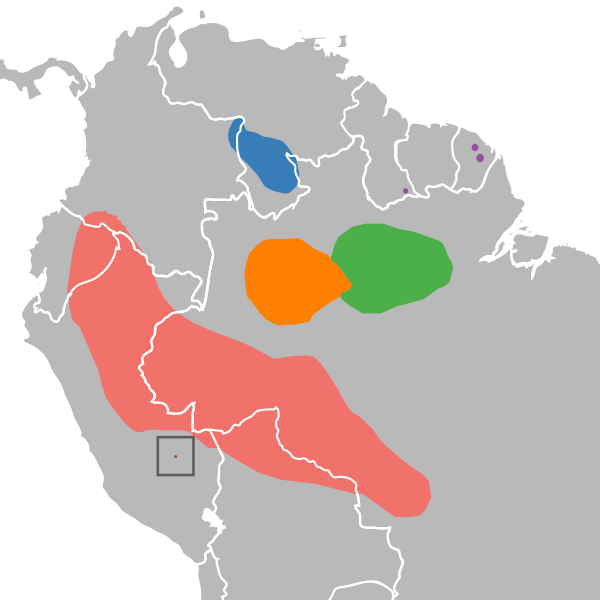
- Isothrix distribution I. bistriata in red, I. orinoci in blue, I. negrensis in orange, I. pagurus in green, I. sinnamariensis in purple, I. barbarabrownae in brown (in box)

Synonyms
- Lasiuromys Deville, 1852

= Isothrix =

Isothrix Temporal range: Pleistocene - Recent

Genus of mammals belonging to the spiny rat family of rodents

The toros or brush-tailed rats, genus Isothrix, are a group of spiny rats found in tropical South America, particularly in the Amazon Basin.

== Description ==
Toros look like large rats with soft fur on the body and long guard hairs on the scaly tail. Head and body is 18-27.5 cm and tail is 17–30 cm. Weight is 320-570 grams.

== Natural history ==
These animals appear to be arboreal, based on the shape of their hind feet. They are thought to spend the day in holes in the ground near trees.

== Systematics ==
The etymology of the genus name Isothrix corresponds to the two ancient greek words ἴσος (ísos), meaning "of equal length", and θρίξ, τριχός (thríx, trikhós), meaning "hair". The etymology of the genus name synonym Lasiuromys corresponds to the three ancient greek words λάσιος (lásios), meaning "furry, with tufted hair", οὐρά (ourá), meaning "animal tail", and μῦς (mûs), meaning "mouse, rat".

There are currently five species recognized in the genus Isothrix:

- Isothrix barbarabrownae- Barbara Brown's Brush-tailed Rat
- Isothrix bistriata - Yellow-crowned brush-tailed rat
- Isothrix negrensis - Rio Negro brush-tailed rat
- Isothrix pagurus - Plain brush-tailed rat
- Isothrix sinnamariensis - Sinnamary brush-tailed rat

There does appear to be good support for the monophyly of three species found in this genus.

== Phylogeny ==
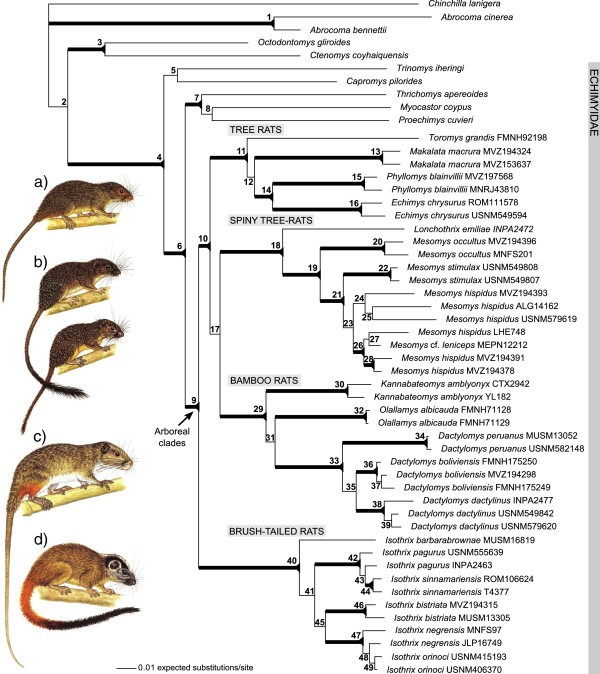

Isothrix is a member of the Echimyini clade of arboreal Echimyidae rodents. Although tentatively considered an echimyine, it has been suggested that Isothrix may not be particularly closely related to other members of its subfamily. This is confirmed by molecular phylogenies in which Isothrix appears as a distant relative of the three clades of Echimyini: (i) Echimys, Phyllomys, Makalata, Pattonomys, and Toromys; (ii) the bamboo rats Dactylomys, Olallamys, Kannabateomys together with Diplomys and Santamartamys; and (iii) the arboreal eumysopines Mesomys and Lonchothrix.

The taxon Callistomys pictus was previously member of the genus Isothrix, but most authors considered it distinct enough to warrant a separate genus. This distinctness has been confirmed by DNA comparative studies in which Callistomys even appears to branch with members of a distinct tribe (i.e., Myocastorini) of the subfamily Echimyinae. The arboreal genera of the subfamily Echimyinae therefore constitute a polyphyletic assemblage.

Genus-level cladogram of the Echimyini.

- Echimyini
  - Isothrix
  - - "Eumysopines"
      - Lonchothrix
        (Tuft-tailed spiny tree-rat)
      - Mesomys
    - - - - Pattonomys
          - Toromys
            (Giant tree-rat)
        - - Makalata
          - - Echimys
            - Phyllomys
      - - - Diplomys
          - Santamartamys
            (Red-crested tree-rat)
        - "Dactylomyines"
          - Kannabateomys
            (Atlantic bamboo rat)
          - - Dactylomys
            - Olallamys

The cladogram has been reconstructed from mitochondrial and nuclear DNA characters.
