= Plain brush-tailed rat =

Plain Brush-tailed Rat

Conservation status
- Least Concern (IUCN 3.1)

Scientific classification
- Kingdom: Animalia
- Phylum: Chordata
- Class: Mammalia
- Infraclass: Placentalia
- Order: Rodentia
- Family: Echimyidae
- Subfamily: Echimyinae
- Tribe: Echimyini
- Genus: Isothrix
- Species: I. pagurus

Binomial name
- Isothrix pagurus Wagner, 1845
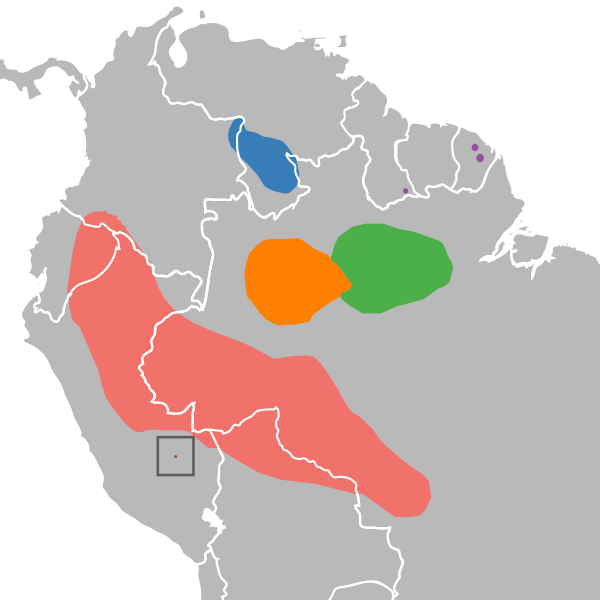
- Isothrix distribution I. pagurus in green

Species of rodent

The Plain brush-tailed rat (Isothrix pagurus) is a spiny rat species found in Brazil.
