= Guinea (region) =

Region of West Africa

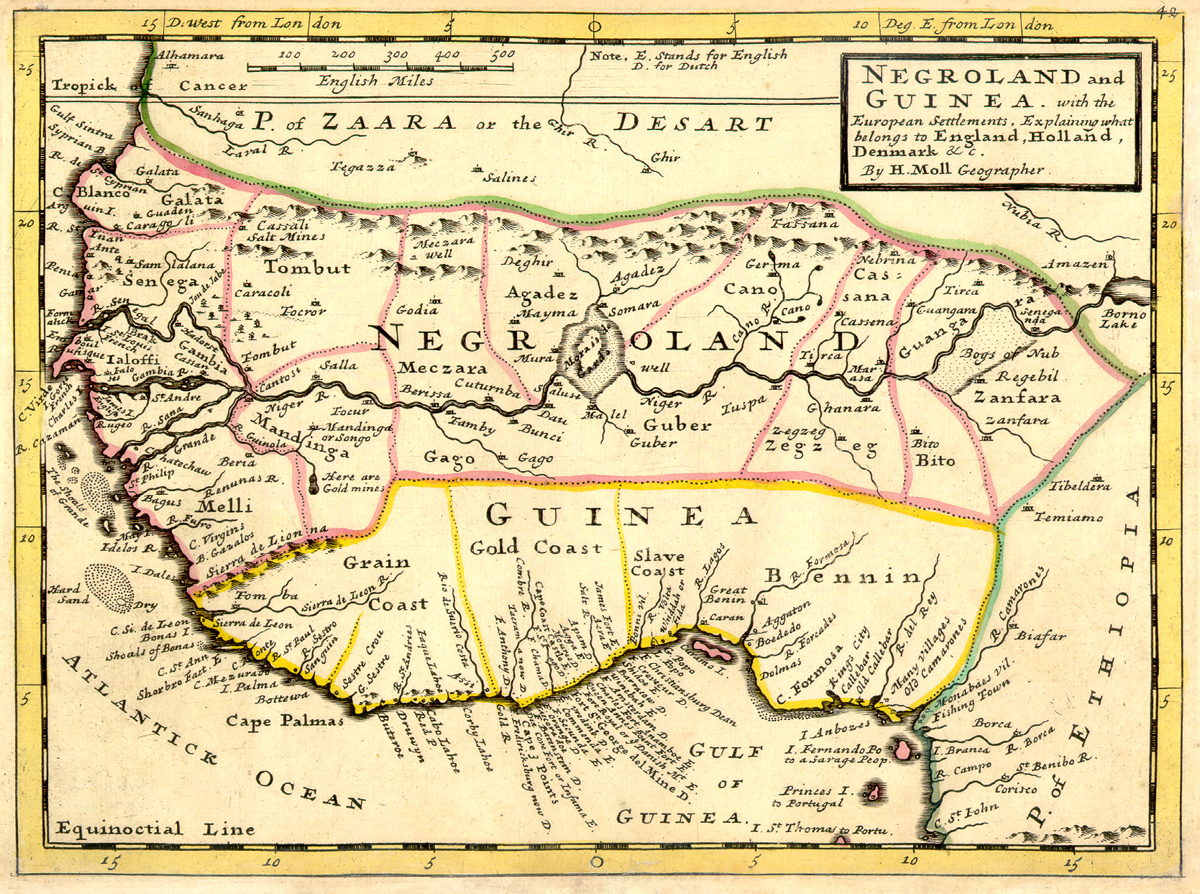
"Negroland and Guinea with the European Settlements", Herman Moll, 1727

Guinea is a traditional name for the region of the coast of West Africa which lies along the Gulf of Guinea. It is a naturally moist tropical forest or savanna that stretches along the coast and borders the Sahel belt in the north.

== Etymology ==
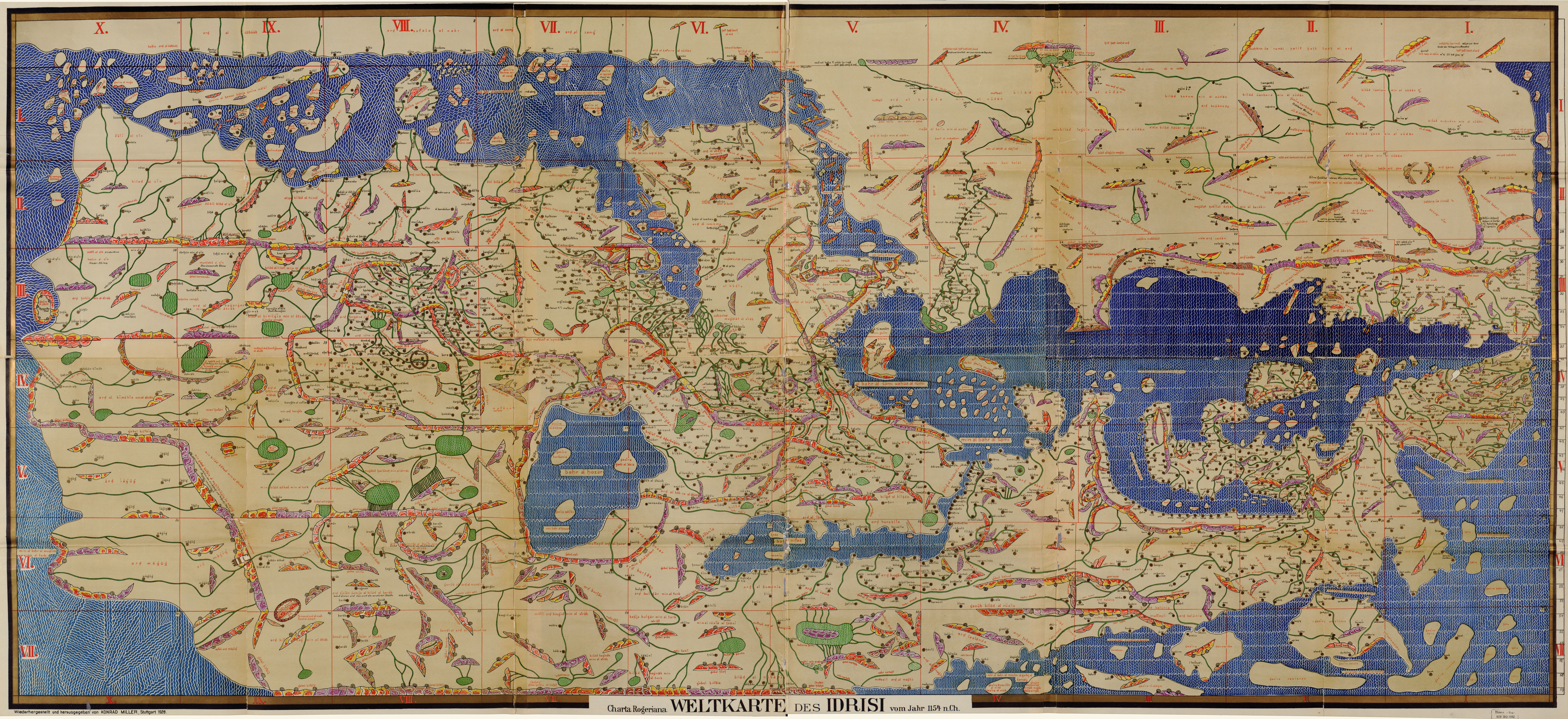
Tabula Rogeriana world map by Al-Idrisi from 1154 showing "Bilad [Arabic for "country" or "town"] Gana min al-Sudan" near two cities labeled "Gana" on the Niger River (see upper right hand corner – south is upwards)

The etymology of "Guinea" is uncertain. The English term Guinea comes directly from the Spanish word Guinea, which in turn derives from the Portuguese word Guiné. The Portuguese term emerged in the mid-15th century to refer to the lands inhabited by the Guineus, a generic term used by the Portuguese to refer to the "black" African peoples living south of the Senegal River (in contrast to the "tawny" Sanhaja Berbers, north of it, whom they called Azenegues). The term "Guinea" is extensively used in the 1453 chronicle of Gomes Eanes de Zurara. King John II of Portugal took up the title of Senhor da Guiné (Lord of Guinea) from 1481.

It is believed the Portuguese borrowed Guineus from the Berber term Ghinawen (sometimes Arabized as غِنَاوَة Ghinawah or Ghinewah) meaning "the burnt people" (analogous to the Classical Greek Aithiops, "of the burned face"). The Berber terms "aginaw" and "Akal n-Iguinawen" mean "black" and "land of the blacks", respectively. This word may, in turn, originate in a local term from the Timbuktu area for black people, in contradistinction to the 'white' Berbers.

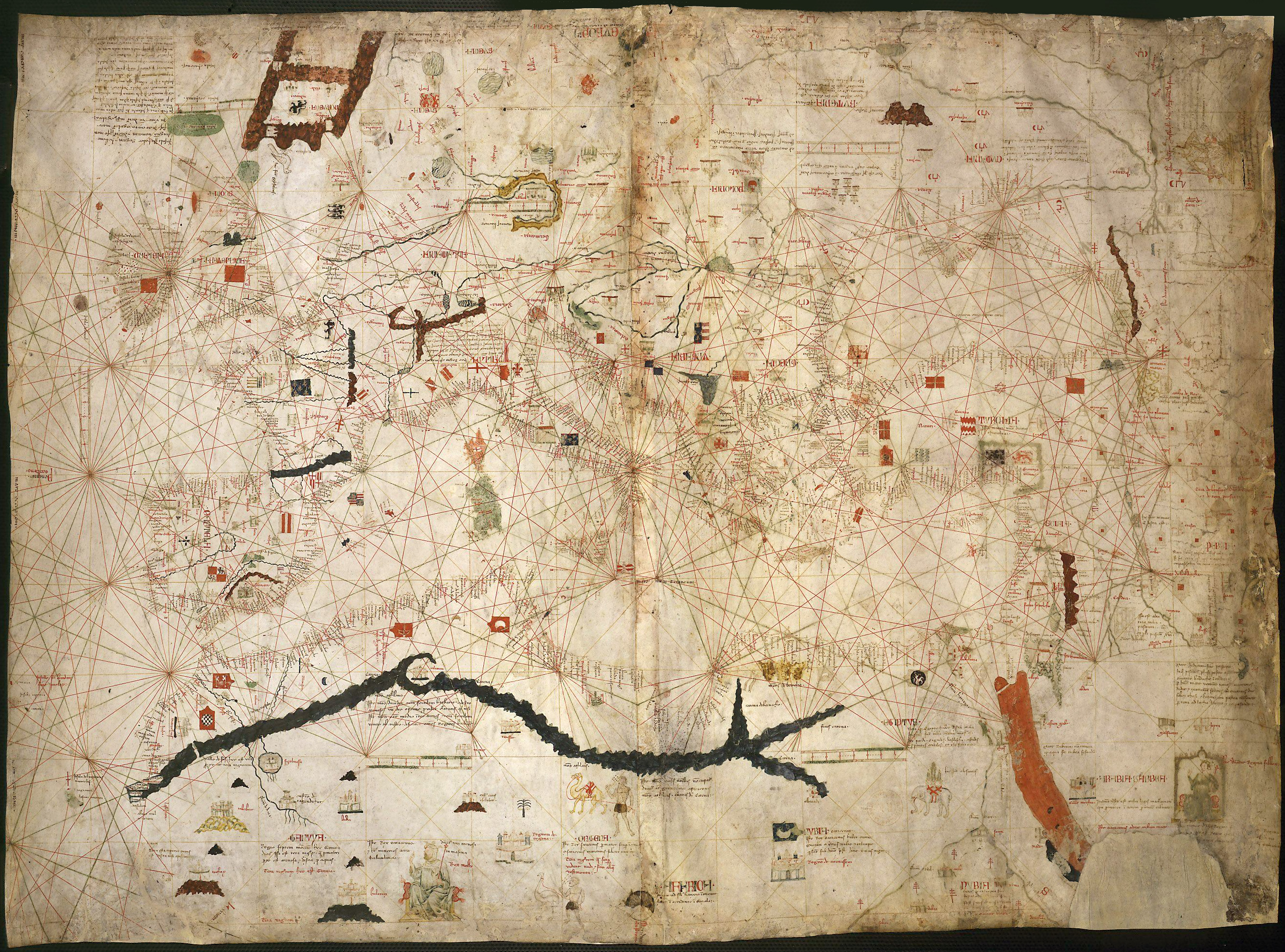
Portolan world map of Angelino Dulcert from 1339 showing the region "Ganuya" (see lower left hand corner)

A competing theory, first forwarded by Leo Africanus in 1526, claims that "Guinea" is derived from Djenné (which he refers to as Gheneo, Genni and Ghinea), the great interior commercial city on the Upper Niger River. Djenné dominated the gold and salt trade across West Africa, from the 11th century (fall of Ghana) until the 13th century (when the Mali invasion disrupted its routes and redirected trade to Timbuktu, hitherto just a small Djenné outpost). It is during the period of Djenné dominance that the term Genewah really comes forward into usage in Arab sources (al-Sudan – Arabic for "blacks" – was used more commonly before).

== History ==
In 1478 (during the War of the Castilian Succession), a Castilian armada of thirty-five caravels and a Portuguese fleet fought the Battle of Guinea in the waters off Elmina, for the hegemony of the Guinea trade (gold, ivory and black pepper). The war ended both with a Portuguese naval victory and the official recognition by the Catholic Monarchs of the Portuguese sovereignty over most of the African territories in dispute (Treaty of Alcáçovas, 1479). This was the first of many colonial wars among European powers. After the Portuguese and Castilians came the Dutch, Danes, French, and British.

The extensive trade in ivory, gold, and slaves made the region wealthy, with a number of centralized kingdoms developing in the 18th and 19th centuries. These were much smaller than the large states of the wide-open Sahel, but they had far higher population densities and were more centralized politically. The cohesion of these kingdoms caused the region to show more resistance to European incursions than other areas of Africa. Such resistance, combined with a disease environment hostile to Europeans, meant that much of Guinea was not colonised by Europeans until the very end of the 19th century.

== Subdivisions ==
Guinea is often subdivided into "Lower Guinea" and "Upper Guinea". Lower Guinea is one of the most densely populated regions of Africa, covering southern Nigeria, Benin, Togo and stretching into Ghana. It includes the coastal regions as well as the interior. Upper Guinea is far less densely populated and stretches from Côte d'Ivoire to Senegal.

Within the Republic of Guinea, Lower Guinea refers to the country's coastal plain, while Upper Guinea refers to the country's interior.

European traders in the region subdivided the region based on its main exports. The eastern portion around Benin and Nigeria was named the Slave Coast. What is now Ghana was called the (British) Gold Coast, a name later given to a British colony in the area which ultimately absorbed earlier European colonies. West of this was the Ivory Coast, still the name of the nation in that region. Farthest west, the area around modern Liberia and Sierra Leone was referred to as either the Pepper Coast or the Grain Coast.

== Countries in the Guinea region ==
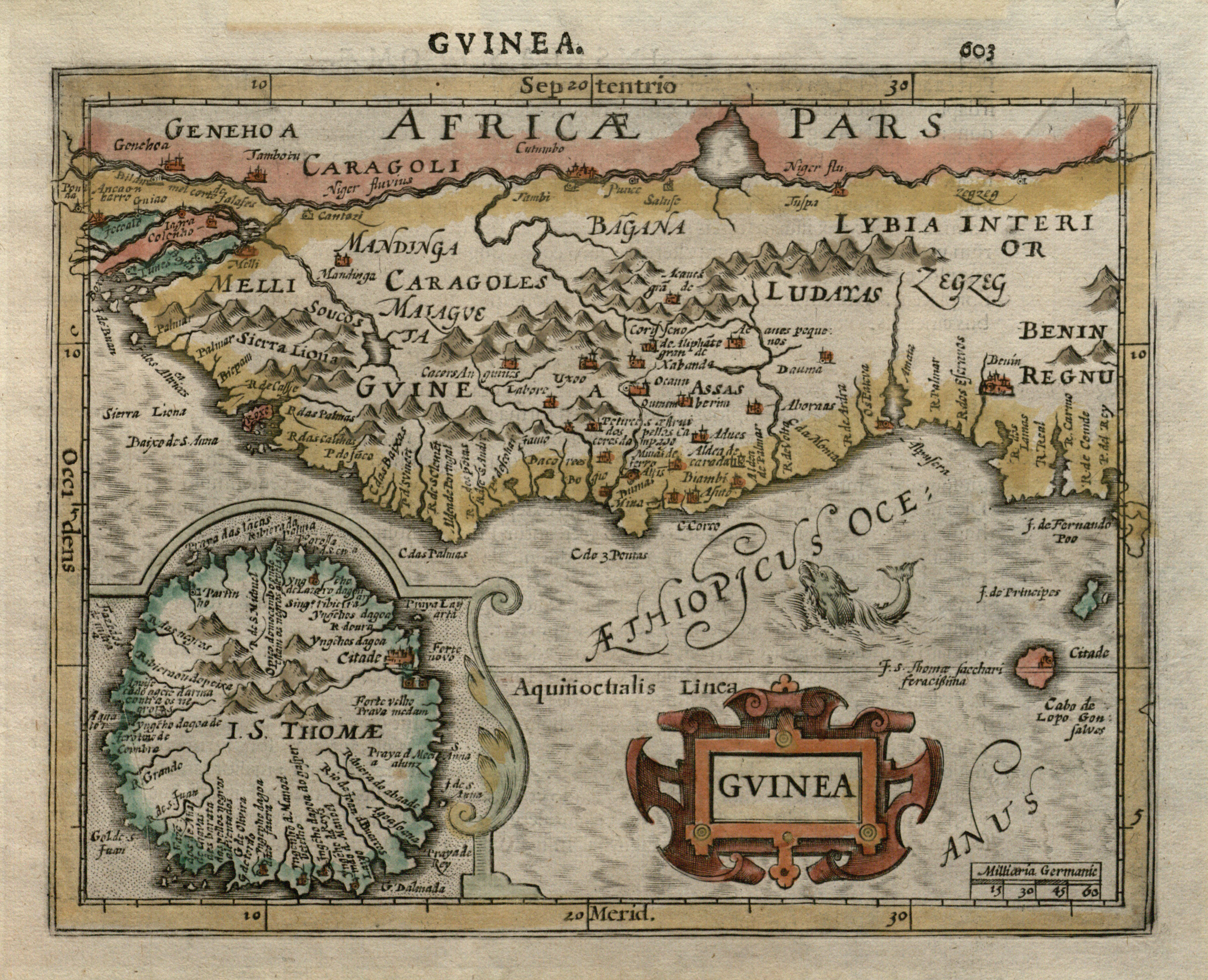
Jodocus Hondius II's map Guinea, 1621

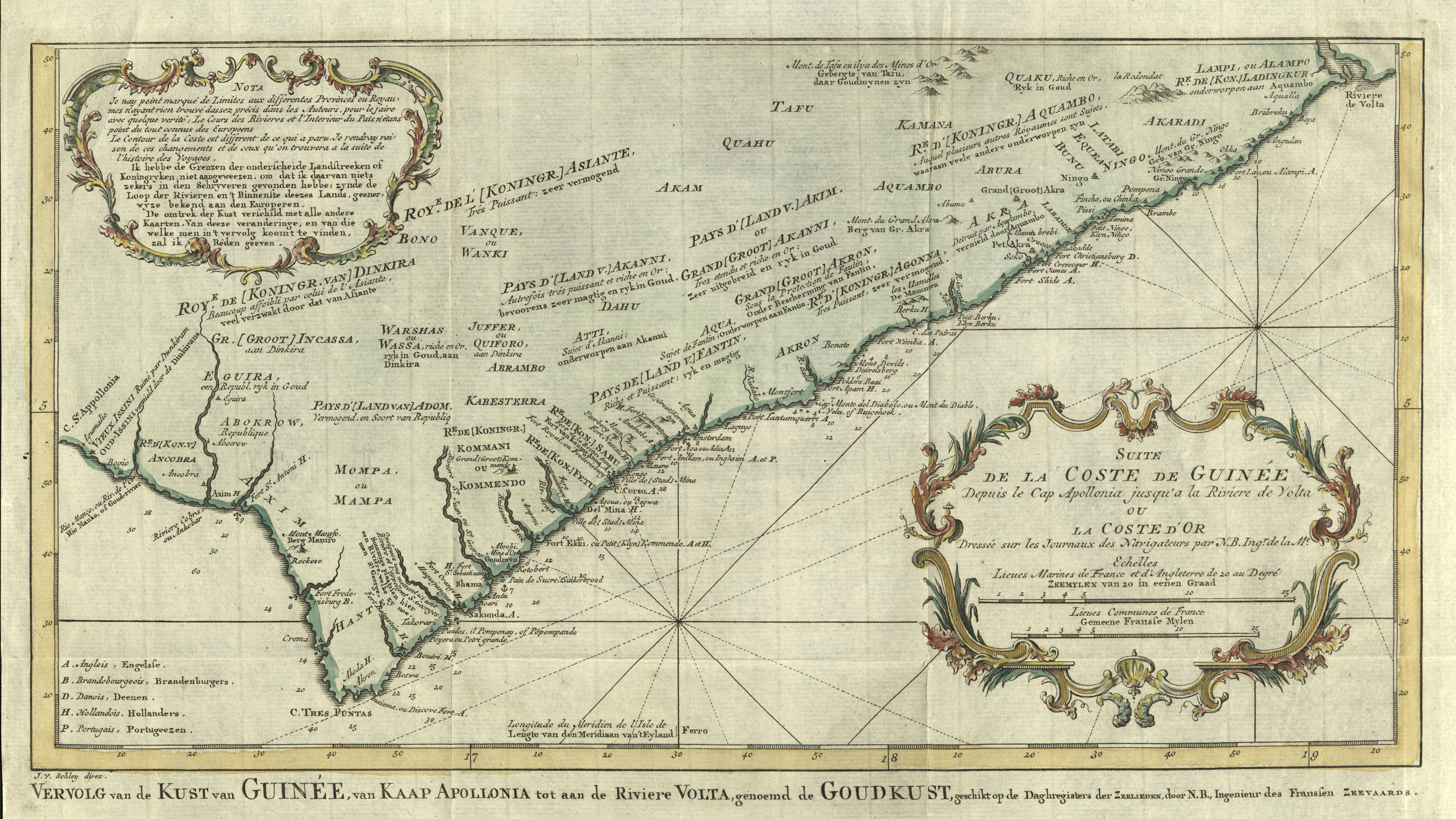
Jakob van der Schley's map Verfolg van de Kust van Guinee, 1747

From north to south:

- Senegal (formerly French)
- The Gambia (formerly British)
- Guinea-Bissau (formerly Portuguese Guinea)
- Guinea (formerly French Guinea)
- Equatorial Guinea (Formerly Spanish Guinea)
- Sierra Leone (British part of the Pepper Coast, originally Province of Freedom)
- Liberia (from U.S. settlements for ex-slaves on the Pepper Coast)
- Ivory Coast or Côte d'Ivoire (formerly French)
- Ghana (formerly the Gold Coast; Danish Guinea, Dutch Guinea, Portuguese Gold Coast (the first), Prussian Gold Coast and Swedish Guinea all ended up absorbed by the British Gold Coast)
- Togo (formerly Togoland)
- Benin (Dahomey)
- Southern Nigeria

== See also ==
- Lower Guinean forests
- Upper Guinean forests
- Guineaman, a ship used to transport slaves from the region of Guinea
