= Ascent of Mont Ventoux =

1336 letter by Petrarch

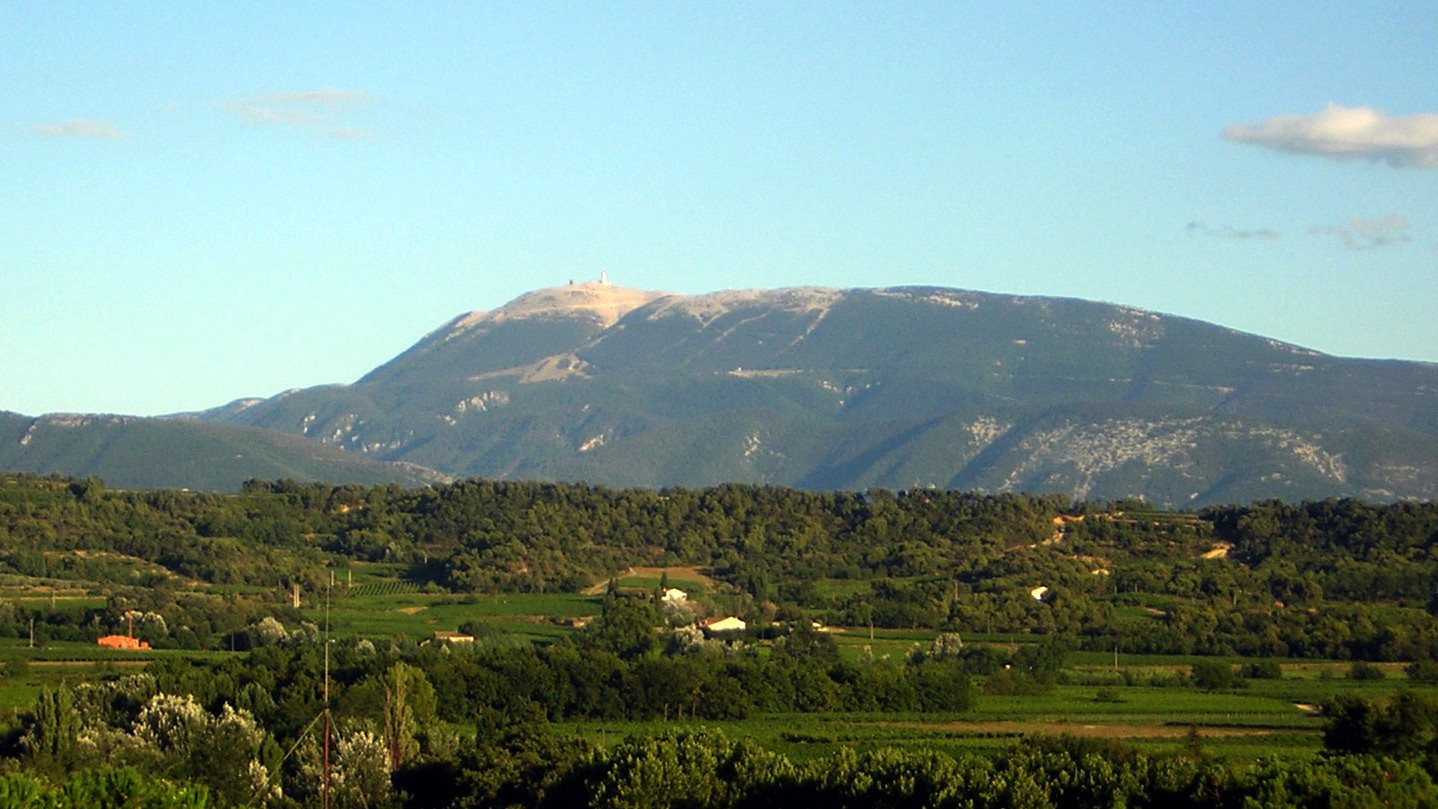
View of Mont Ventoux from Mirabel-aux-Baronnies

The Italian poet Petrarch wrote about his ascent of Mont Ventoux (in Provence; elevation 1,912 metres [6,273 ft]) on 26 April 1336, in a well-known letter published as one of his Epistolae familiares (IV, 1). In this letter, written around 1350, Petrarch claimed to be the first person since antiquity to have climbed a mountain for the view. Although the historical accuracy of his account has been questioned by modern scholars, it is often cited in discussions of the new spirit of the Renaissance.

== Contents ==
Petrarch's letter is addressed to his former confessor, Dionigi di Borgo San Sepolcro. It says he ascended the mountain with his brother Gherardo and two servants exactly ten years after they had left Bologna. They began at the village of Malaucène at the foot of the mountain. On the way up, they met an old shepherd who said he had climbed the mountain some fifty years before, finding only rocks and brambles and that no one else had done it before or since. The brothers continued, Gherardo continuing up the ridge they were following, Petrarch ever trying for an easier, if longer, path. At the top, they found a peak called Filiolus, "Little Son"; Petrarch reflected on the past ten years and the waste of his earthly love for Laura. They looked out from that spot, seeing the Rhone and the Cévennes, but not the Pyrenees (which are 320 kilometres [200 miles] away). At this point, Petrarch sat down, opened Augustine's Confessions, and immediately came upon "And men go about to wonder at the heights of the mountains, and the mighty waves of the sea, and the wide sweep of rivers, and the circuit of the ocean, and the revolution of the stars, but themselves they consider not." Petrarch fell silent on the trip down, reflecting on the vanity of human wishes and the nobility of uncorrupted human thought. When they arrived back in the village in the middle of the night, Petrarch wrote this letter "hastily and extemporaneously" - or so he says.

== Historic doubts ==
It is often claimed that Petrarch was the first to climb Mont Ventoux, although he did not suggest so himself. The mountain was likely already climbed in prehistoric times. There is even a slightly older written account of an ascent by Jean Buridan, who, on his way to the papal court in Avignon before the year 1334, climbed Mt. Ventoux "to make some meteorological observations." It seems implausible that Petrarch sat down and wrote the six thousand words we have, in elegant Latin with correct quotations from the classical poets, before dinner after an eighteen-hour hike up and down a mountain. In fact, whether Petrarch himself climbed the mountain has been doubted by modern scholars; according to Pierre Courcelle and Giuseppe Billanovich, the letter is essentially a fiction written almost fifteen years after its supposed date, and almost a decade after the death of its addressee, Francesco Dionigi da Borgo San Sepulcro. Lyell Asher argued, indeed, that the ascent of the mountain was a figurative account of writing the letter itself.

== Modern reception ==
Jakob Burckhardt, in The Civilization of the Renaissance in Italy declared Petrarch "a truly modern man" because of the significance of nature for his "receptive spirit"; even if he did not yet have the skill to describe nature. Petrarch's implication that he was the first to climb mountains for pleasure, and Burckhardt's insistence on Petrarch's sensitivity to nature have been often repeated since. There are also numerous references to Petrarch as an "alpinist". However Mont Ventoux is not a hard climb, and is not usually considered part of the Alps. This implicit claim of Petrarch and Burckhardt, that Petrarch was the first to climb a mountain for pleasure since antiquity, was disproven by Lynn Thorndike in 1943.

The Legitimacy of the Modern Age by Hans Blumenberg describes Petrarch's ascent of Ventoux as "one of the great moments that oscillate indecisively between the epochs," namely between the medieval period and modernity. He also uses it to illustrate his theory of intellectual history: "The description of the ascent of Mont Ventoux exemplifies graphically what is meant by the 'reality' of history as the reoccupation of formal systems of positions."

James Hillman, in Re-Visioning Psychology, uses the story of Petrarch's ascent to illustrate his argument that the outer world of nature is mirrored by an equally vast inner world of images. Both worlds exist apart from the human being. The outer world may have motivated Petrarch to climb Mont Ventoux, but the inner world is what he discovered when he reached the top and read the passage from Augustine's Confessions.

The findings support this argument, that aesthetic experiences of nature and landscape can also be found in medieval accounts, such as the ascent of the volcanic mountain Vulcano by the Dominican friar Burchard of Mount Sion. Therefore, what is new for Petrarch compared to medieval reports is the artistic representation of his mountain ascent as a subjective experience of autonomy.

Petrarch's account of the ascension was translated into modern Provençal by poet and retired general Marcel Audema, as La mountado vers lou Ventour.

== See also ==
- Jacob Burckhardt

== Bibliography ==
- Bishop, Morris (1963). Petrarch and His World. Bloomington: Indiana University Press.
- Blumenberg, Hans (1983). The Legitimacy of the Modern Age. Translated by Wallace, Robert M. Cambridge, MA: MIT Press.
- Burckhardt, Jacob (1890). The Civilization of the Renaissance in Italy. Translated by Middlemore, S. G. C. New York: Macmillan.
- Kimmelman, Michael (6 June 1999). "NOT Because it's There". The New York Times Magazine. pp. 116–118, 120. ProQuest 215515406.
- O'Connell, Michael (1983). "Authority and the Truth of Experience in Petrarch's 'Ascent of Mount Ventoux'". Philological Quarterly. 62: 507–520.
- Thorndike, Lynn; Johnson, Francis R; Kristeller, Paul Oskar; Lockwood, Dean P; Thorndike, Lynn (January 1943). "Renaissance or Prenaissance?". Journal of the History of Ideas. 4 (1). University of Pennsylvania Press: 65–74. ISSN 0022-5037. JSTOR 2707236.
