= El Negro =

"El Negro" is a common Spanish language nickname, meaning "The Black".

== People ==
- Estevanico (1500–1539), African explorer of the New World
- Negro of Banyoles (born c. 1803), Tswana warrior taxidermied and put on display in Spain
- Juan Matta-Ballesteros (born 1945), Honduran drug lord
- Arturo Durazo Moreno (1924–2000), Mexican chief of police and convicted criminal
- Alberto Olmedo (1933-1988), Argentine humorist
- Fernando "El Negro" Chamorro (1933–1994), Nicaraguan rebel
- Roberto Fontanarrosa (1944–2007), Argentine cartoonist
- Jorge Pabón (194?–1988), close collaborator of Pablo Escobar
- José Guadalupe Esparza, (born 1954), Mexican musician
- Iván Arias (born 1958), Bolivian journalist and politician
- Martín Ramírez (cyclist) (born 1960), a Colombian cyclist
- Alejandro González Iñárritu (born 1963), Mexican filmmaker
- Horacio(El Negro)Hernandez (born 1963), Cuban drummer

== Other ==
- El Negro en ik, a book by Frank Westerman, about the controversy surrounding Negro of Banyoles and Georges Cuvier

== See also ==
- Kuro (disambiguation)
- Negro (disambiguation)
