= Rio Negro =

Río Negro (Spanish and Portuguese, 'Black River') may refer to:

== Rivers ==
=== South America ===
==== Brazil ====
- Rio Negro (Amazon), tributary of the Amazon River
- Rio Negro (Mato Grosso do Sul)
- Rio Negro (Paraná)
- Rio Negro (Rio de Janeiro)
- Rio Negro (Rondônia)
- Rio Negro (Tocantins)

==== Other ====
- Río Negro (Argentina), in Patagonia
- Río Negro (Los Lagos), in Southern Chile
- Río Negro (Uruguay), in Rio Grande do Sul, Brazil and Uruguay, a tributary of the Uruguay River.
- Río Negro (Chaco Province), in Argentina, tributary of the Paraná River

=== Central America ===
- Río Negro (Central America), forming part of the border between Honduras and Nicaragua
- Chixoy River, also known as the Río Negro, in Guatemala

== Political divisions ==
=== South America ===
- Río Negro Province, Argentina
- Rio Negro, Paraná, a municipality in Brazil
- Rio Negro, Mato Grosso do Sul, a municipality in Brazil
- Río Negro, Chile, a city and commune in Osorno Province
- Río Negro, Palena, a town in Palena Province, Chile
- Rionegro, a city and municipality in Colombia
- Rionegro, Santander, a town and municipality in Colombia
- Rionegro Province, Colombia
- Río Negro Department, Uruguay
- Río Negro Municipality, Venezuela
- Río Negro, Guatemala, a city

== Other ==
- Río Negro (newspaper), published in Argentina
- Atlético Rio Negro Clube, a Brazilian football team from Manaus, Amazonas state
- Rionegro (TransMilenio) a TransMilenio transportation system station in Bogotá, Colombia
- Río Negro Massacre, Guatemala
- Rio Negro tuco-tuco, a species of rodent
- Río Negro National Park in Paraguay
- Rio Negro Brush-tailed Rat, a species of rodent
- Palácio Rio Negro, one of the official residences of the President of Brazil
- Río Negro (film), a 1976 Cuban film
- Río Negro Airport in Chile

== See also ==
- Black River (disambiguation)
