= Sinnamary brush-tailed rat =

Conservation status
- Least Concern (IUCN 3.1)

Scientific classification
- Kingdom: Animalia
- Phylum: Chordata
- Class: Mammalia
- Order: Rodentia
- Family: Echimyidae
- Subfamily: Echimyinae
- Tribe: Echimyini
- Genus: Isothrix
- Species: I. sinnamariensis

Binomial name
- Isothrix sinnamariensis Vié, Volobouev, Patton & Granjon, 1996
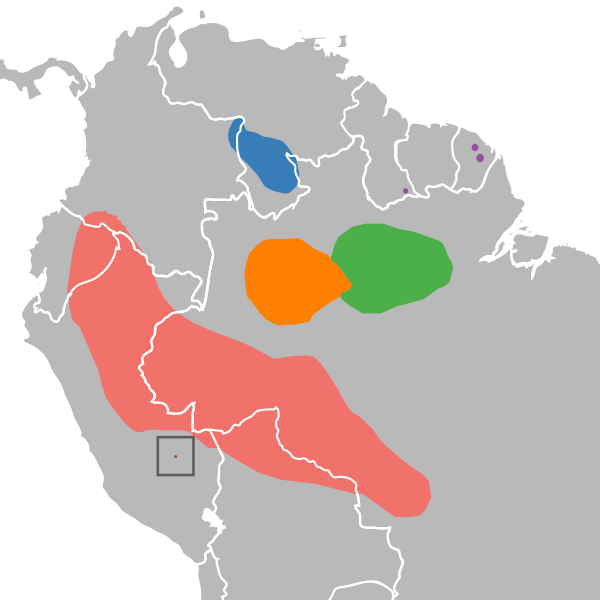
- Isothrix distribution I. sinnamariensis in purple

Species of rodent

The Sinnamary brush-tailed rat (Isothrix sinnamariensis), is a species of rodent in the family of Echimyidae. It is found in French Guiana, Guyana, and possibly Suriname. Its natural habitat is subtropical or tropical moist lowland forests.
