= Negros (disambiguation) =

Negros is an island in the Philippines.

Negros may also refer to:

== Places ==
=== Philippines ===
- Negros Island Region, an administrative region (2015–2017, 2024–present)
- Negros Occidental, a province on Negros Island
- Negros Oriental, a province on Negros Island

==== Former entities ====
- Negros (province), a former province (1865–1890)
- Republic of Negros, a short-lived revolutionary entity (1898–1901)
- Negros del Norte, a short-lived province that existed in 1986

=== Other countries ===
- Negros, Corozal, Puerto Rico
- Negros, Redondela, Spain
- Los Negros Island, Papua New Guinea

== Other uses ==
- a plural of Negro
- Negros Navigation, a domestic shipping company in the Philippines
- Los Negros, a criminal organization in Mexico

== See also ==
- Negro (disambiguation)
