= Negro Creek (Wyoming) =

Stream in Wyoming, U.S.

Coordinates: 42°45′39″N 106°05′35″W

Negro Creek is a stream in Wyoming, United States.

Negro Creek was known as Nigger Creek until the name was changed in the 1960s.

== See also ==
- List of rivers of Wyoming
