= Negro Wash =

Waterway in Gila County, Arizona

Coordinates: 33.5014414°N 110.8603903°W

Negro Wash is a stream in Gila County, Arizona, in the United States.

Negro Wash was known as "Nigger Wash" until the name was changed in the 1960s. Its elevation is 924 meters.

== See also ==
- List of rivers of Arizona
