= Tims River =

River in Madison County, Virginia, United States

Coordinates: 38.5553°N 78.3521°W

Tims River, formerly Negro Run, is a 1.8 mile long tributary of the Robinson River within the Shenandoah National Park in Virginia.

== History of racist place names ==
Negro Run was one of "at least 1,441 federally recognized places across the nation include slurs in their official name". At least 558 place names refer to African Americans specifically in a derogatory manner. This creek was originally called Tim's River in 1753 and officially named Nigger Run in 1933. It, and all other geographic features, replaced the word "Nigger" with "Negro" in 1962 by order of the Secretary of the Interior.

== Name change process ==
In November 2015, a local hiker sent a letter to the Deputy Director of the National Park Service expressing concern about the creek called Negro Run and suggesting that it be renamed "Oak Run" to reflect its proximity to White Oak Canyon. African-American families were living in the lower White Oak Canyon during the Jim Crow era, which is most likely the basis of the official name change in 1933 to Nigger Run. From that letter, the Shenandoah National Park Superintendent began the process of officially changing the racist name of the creek. The Board of Geographic Names reached out to other state and local historical societies to ask for comment on the proposal. The Madison County Historical Society preferred to see the creek named "Dyer Run" after the family that owned the property and lived in that area prior to the establishment of the park. By December 2016 the local African-American community had worked with the historical society to come to an agreement on the new name to be proposed to the Board of Geographic Names.

The competing proposed names, "Freedom Run" by the National Park Service and "Dyer Run" by the Madison County Historical Society, were mutually withdrawn and replaced by the proposal to rename Negro Run "Tims River" at the 789th meeting of the Board of Geographic Names Domestic Names Committee on December 8, 2016. The proposed name and case summary was included in Review List 426 released December 30, 2016 and subsequently approved by the Board of Geographic Names on February 9, 2017.
