= Rio Negro brush-tailed rat =

Conservation status
- Least Concern (IUCN 3.1)

Scientific classification
- Kingdom: Animalia
- Phylum: Chordata
- Class: Mammalia
- Infraclass: Placentalia
- Order: Rodentia
- Family: Echimyidae
- Subfamily: Echimyinae
- Tribe: Echimyini
- Genus: Isothrix
- Species: I. negrensis

Binomial name
- Isothrix negrensis Thomas, 1920
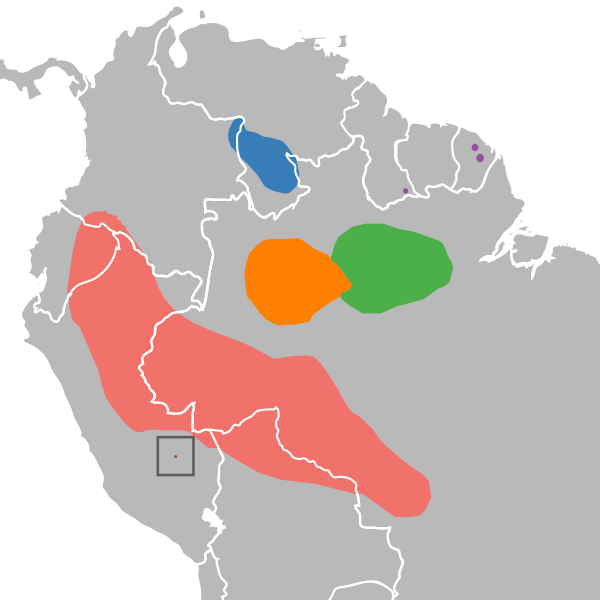
- Isothrix distribution I. negrensis in orange

Species of rodent

The Rio Negro brush-tailed rat or dark brush-tailed tree rat (Isothrix negrensis), is a spiny rat species found in Brazil.
