= HMS Negro =

Several ships of the Royal Navy were named Negro

- HMS Negro (1813), ex-Niger (1759), a Niger-class frigate
- HMS Negro (1915), an Admiralty M-class destroyer
- HMS Negro (1939) (FY 717), a minesweeping naval trawler
