= Akal n-Iguinawen =

Akal n-Iguinawen is a Berber phrase meaning "land of the black people." The phrase generally refers to Guinea or Sudan.
