= Negro Run =

Negro Run may refer to:

- Negro Run (New Jersey), a tributary of Doctors Creek in Monmouth County
- Negro Run, former name of Tims River in Madison County, Virginia
- Negro Run, a tributary of the North Anna River in Orange and Louisa counties, Virginia
- Negro Run (Virginia), a tributary of the North Anna River in Orange and Louisa counties
- Negro Run (West Virginia), a stream in Wood County
