= Negro Creek (Tongue Creek tributary) =

Stream in Delta County, Colorado, U.S.

Coordinates: 38°48′25″N 108°00′08″W

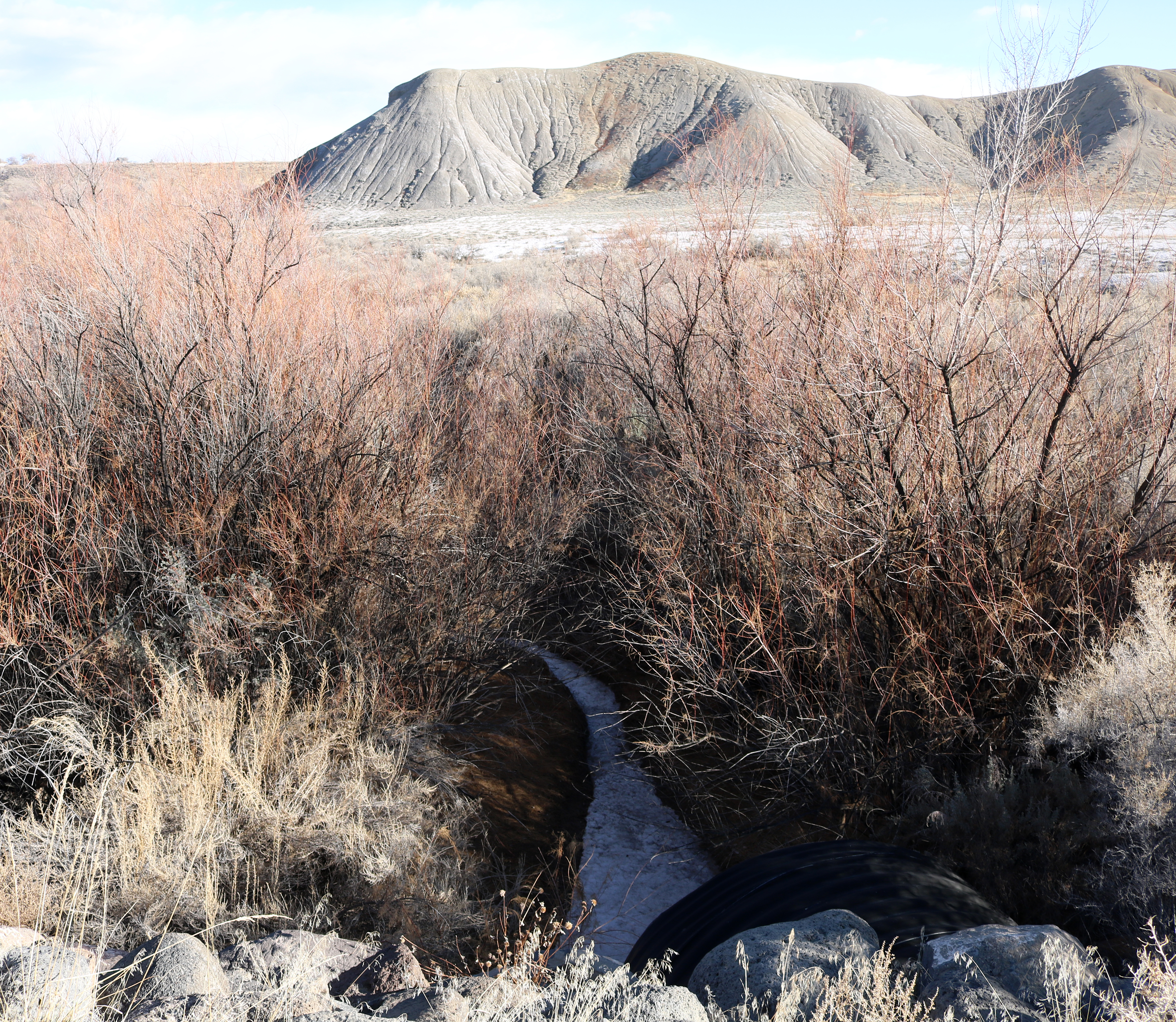
The creek, frozen in winter. It merges with Tongue creek to the left of the hill in the distance.

Negro Creek is a stream in Delta County, Colorado, in the United States. It is a tributary of Tongue Creek.

Negro Creek was known as Nigger Creek until the name was changed in the 1960s.

== See also ==
- List of rivers of Colorado
