= Negro (surname) =

The surname Negro may refer to:

- Alfonso Negro (1915-1984), American-born Italian footballer
- Benedikt Negro, German mime, clown and actor best known for his lead performance in Cirque du Soleil's O
- Dalmacio Negro Pavón (1931–2024), Spanish philosopher, academic and author
- Fred Negro (born 1959), Australian satirist and musician
- Maikol Negro (born 1988), Italian footballer
- Paolo Negro (born 1972), Italian footballer and manager
