= Negro Hill (disambiguation) =

Negro Hill is a hill in Antarctica.

Negro Hill may also refer to:

- Negro Hill (Delaware County, New York), a mountain in the Catskill Mountains
- Negro Hill, a former mining town near Condemned Bar, California
