= Negro Creek (South Dakota) =

Stream in Pennington County, South Dakota, U.S.

Coordinates: 43°53′32″N 103°41′27″W

Negro Creek is a stream in Pennington County, South Dakota, in the United States. The creek was previously known as "Nigger Creek" until the name was changed in the 1960s. It was named after a Black prospector who worked in the area.

== See also ==
- List of rivers of South Dakota
