= Negro Butte =

Mountain in California, United States

Coordinates: 34.46611°N 116.77558°W

Negro Butte is a summit in San Bernardino County, California, in the United States. It has an elevation of 3,527 feet (1,075 m).

== History ==
The name was likely selected to honor a Black miner of the California Gold Rush.
