= Andalò del Negro =

Italian astronomer and geographer

Andalò del Negro (also Andalò di Negro; Genoa, c. 1260 – Naples, 1334) was a medieval Italian astronomer and geographer.

In 1318 he joined the retinue of Robert of Anjou who was then in Genoa, and spent the rest of his life attached to the Angevin court in Naples where he became friends with Boccaccio.

== Selected publications ==
- Introductorius ad iudicia astrologie
- Opus praeclarissimum astrolabii
- De operatione quadrantis
- Tractatus spherae
- De compositione astrolabii
