= Negro Creek (British Columbia) =

Creek in British Columbia, Canada

Coordinates: 49°25′41″N 119°56′35″W

Negro Creek is a creek located in the East Kootenay region of British Columbia. Formerly named Nigger Creek, the name was changed in 1961. The name Negro Creek was officially rescinded in 2023 following a complaint, with no new name proposed. The creek flows into the Moyie River and was discovered in the 1860s. This creek has been mined by both Europeans and Chinese miners.
