= Negro Lakes =

Lake in Wisconsin, United States

Coordinates: 46°17′19″N 89°59′02″W

Negro Lakes was a lake in Iron County, Wisconsin, in the United States until its name was changed to Snowshoe Lakes.

Wisconsin DNR records show no "Negro Lakes" in Iron County.

== See also ==
- List of lakes in Wisconsin
