= Dokumental =

German ink company

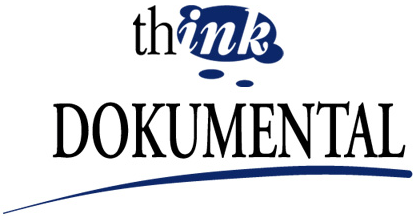
- Company type: GmbH & Co KG
- Industry: Chemicals
- Founded: 1952
- Headquarters: Ludwigshafen, Germany
- Key people: Christian Diehlmann (Managing Director)
- Products: Writing inks, Inkjet inks
- Website: www.dokumental.de

Dokumental GmbH & Co KG Schreibfarben is a German-based company and claims to be the world market leader in the development and production of inks and writing fluids. The products are solely produced in Germany (Ludwigshafen und Mittenwald) and sold in more than 100 countries all over the world. Dokumental belongs to the Woellner Group Holding.

The product range includes all kinds of writing fluids, like inks for ball pens, roller balls, gel pens, board markers, permanent markers, highlighters etc. Newly developed products are inks certified according to CE and smooth writing inks for ball pens. Dokumental also offers varied support e.g. for the development of new products, searching for individual solutions or even regulatory questions.

DOKU-Inkjet: Dokumental also offers tailor-made inks for professional Inkjet applications, whereas the focus is on UV-curable inks.

== History ==
Year	Event
1949	The first ink was developed in Mittenwald
1952	Mittenwald Chemie is founded
1964	The company IKF was established in Ludwigshafen
1992	Mittenwald Chemie and IKF merge to form Dokumental. Dokumental is from now on the market leader for writing fluids.
1998	Integration of Dokumental into the Woellner Group
2008	DOKU-Inkjet starts
