= AIHAO =

Chinese stationery company

WENZHOU AIHAO PEN TRADE
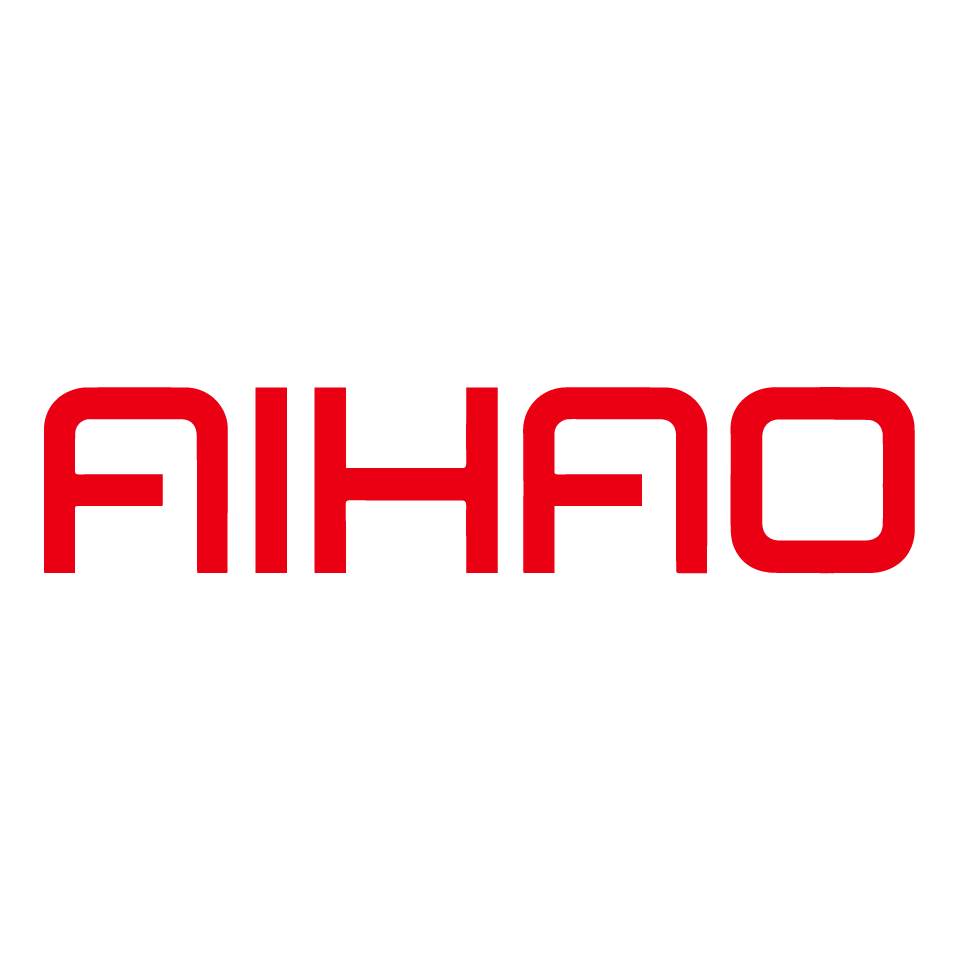
- Native name: 温州市爱好笔业有限公司
- Type: Private
- Industry: Consumer Discretionary Products
- Genre: stationery goods
- Predecessor: Longwan Changsheng Pen Factory
- Founded: 1995; 31 years ago
- Founder: Zang Hanping
- Headquarters: Wenzhou, China
- Area served: 120 countries
- Products: pens
- Production output: 1.8 million (2013)
- Number of employees: 4,000 (2025)
- Website: http://aihao.com

WENZHOU AIHAO PEN TRADE (温州市爱好笔业有限公司) is a Chinese multinational company known for manufacturing stationery goods, specially pens.

== History ==
AIHAO was created in 1995 by Zang Hanping. Both AIHAO and Wenzhou Tianjiao Pen Industry originated from Longwan Changsheng Pen Factory, founded in 1986. In 1998, AIHAO had a retail store in Yiwu, China's largest market for small products. AIHAO sold an estimate of ¥ 40 million in products at the commodity market.

In 2002, the local government developed the ¥ 600 million and 480,000 m^{2} industrial site in Wenzhou, known as China's Pen Capital. 45 companies from the sector, including AIHAO, relocated to the site. The company was selected by the Wenzhou Pen Manufacturers Association as a pilot for e-commerce for the segment and received government sponsorship. To modernize its factories, AIHAO invested in advanced foreign technology from South Korea, Japan, Taiwan, and other countries. Companies involved in the construction of the manufacturing site included GF AgieCharmilles, Erowa AG, Fadal Machining Center, and Mitutoyo. AIHAO benefited from low tariffs due to China's entrance into the World Trade Organization in 2001. The workforce was initially local, but AIHAO suffered from labor shortages due to the low wages, and the locals were replaced by immigrants who are trained in local universities since 2007.

As the company grew, in 2008 AIHAO launched its own R&D center for ¥ 90 million and in 2010 AIHAO launched China's largest stainless steel ball-point pen workshop for ¥ 30 million. AIHAO changed its focus to the design of the pens and until 2013 had more than 200 patents.

== Products ==
In 2013, AIHAO fabricated nearly 400 varieties of pens, including gel ink pens, ball-point pens, fountain pens, roller ball pens, carbon pens, highlighting pens, marking pens, fluorescent pens, crayons and felt-tip pens.

Most of AIHAO's products are for exportation, reaching more than 100 countries, and the company is respected internationally. In 2013, the company reached the production of 1.8 million pens a day. Their most famous product is the ball-point pen, which uses pen tips from Premec (Switzerland) and ink from Mikuni Corporation (Japan) and National Corporation (United States). In 2014, AIHAO was world's largest producer of roller ball pens.

== Awards ==
AIHAO received many awards and titles over the years, including "China's Master of Pens" and "Famous Zeijiang Brand".

== See also ==
- List of multinational corporations
- List of pen types, brands and companies
