= Reynolds International Pen Company =

Manufacturing company of writing instruments

Reynolds Pens India Pvt. Ltd.
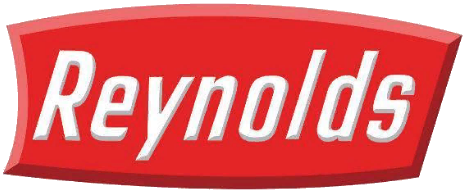
- Company type: Subsidiary
- Industry: Writing instruments
- Founded: 1945; 81 years ago in New York City
- Founder: Milton Reynolds
- Fate: Acquired by Newell Brands, became a brand
- Headquarters: Andheri, Mumbai, India
- Products: ballpoint, gel, rollerball, and fountain pens, mechanical pencils
- Parent: Newell Brands
- Subsidiaries: Reynolds Pens India
- Website: reynolds-pens.com

Reynolds Pens India Pvt. Ltd. is an Indian manufacturing company of writing instruments, mainly pens, currently headquartered in Andheri, Mumbai. The company was established in 1945 by Milton Reynolds in New York City.

Products commercialized under the Reynolds name include ballpoint, gel, rollerball, and fountain pens, and mechanical pencils.

== History ==
In June 1945, Chicago businessman Milton Reynolds was in Buenos Aires, Argentina, when he came across the first commercialized ballpoint, the Biro pen.

In October 1945, Milton was able to reverse engineer the Biro pen and was the first to manufacture and sell ballpoint pens into the US market. "Reynolds Rocket" pen was introduced at Gimbel’s department store in New York City, selling $100,000 worth of pens on the first day. Demand in 1945 was running 30,000 pens per day, making it America's #1 ballpoint pen. However, within three years the price of the pen went from $12.50 to 50¢.

The Reynolds Rocket Pen had a tiny ball bearing that let ink out only when pressed against the item you were writing on. In advertisements Reynolds claimed it had enough ink to last 15 years without refilling.

In 1947, in a publicity stunt to promote Reynolds' pens Milton Reynolds and William Odom announced they would beat Howard Hughes's round-the-world flight speed record. They set a new record time of under 79 hours by flying the "Reynolds Bombshell" around the world while managing to pass out thousands of pens.

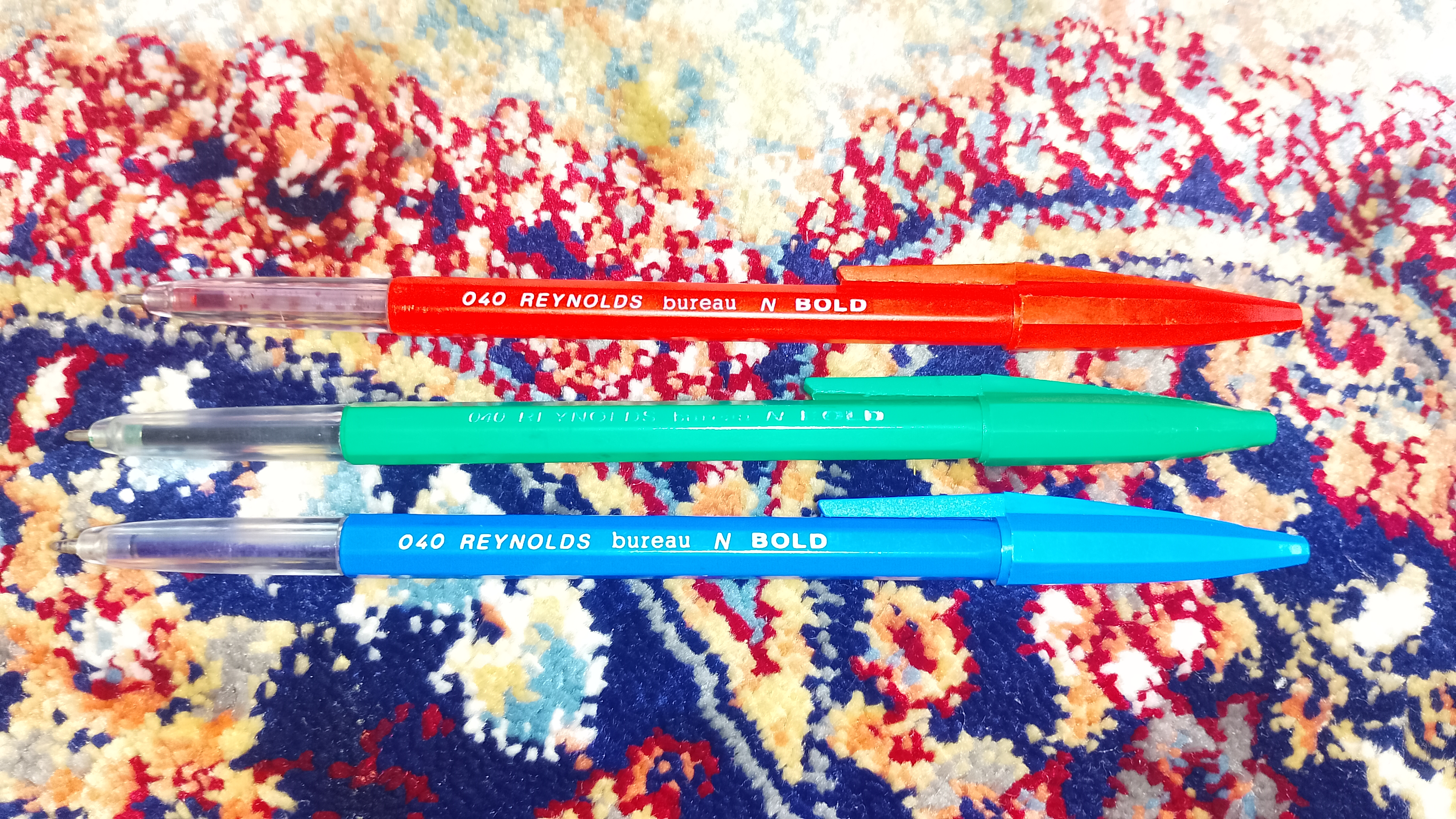
Reynolds 040 Bold ball pens in blue, red and green

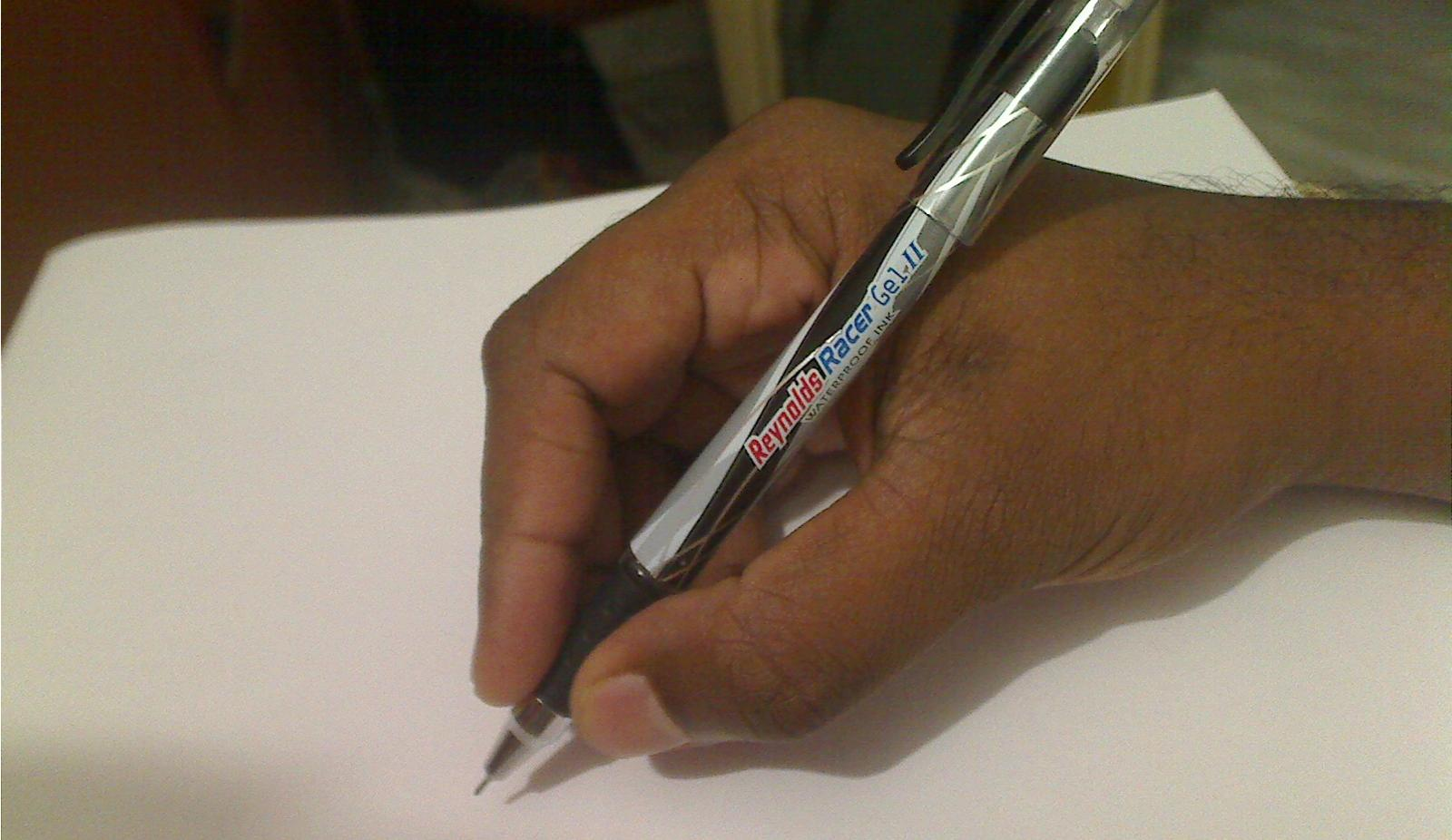
A Reynolds Racer Gel-II gel pen

In 1948, Reynolds expanded overseas and opened Reynolds European, and later in 1959 spun out Reynolds European SA as an independent company focused on non-ferrous metals.

The Chicago-based Reynolds Pen Company closed with Milton Reynolds moving to Mexico. The French subsidiary survived as did their Indian licensee. Later, the French subsidiary would be purchased.

In 2000, Newell Rubbermaid acquired Reynolds Pens France and in 2007, announced they would be closing the French manufacturing plants, causing huge labor union protests.

In May 2016, Reynolds' licensee—GM Pens International—in India decided to end their exclusive contract and stopped making Reynold branded pens, instead choosing to make their own Rorito brand pen.

The current Reynolds' licensee is Flair Pens. Flair markets and distributes Reynolds pens in India. Reynolds has an R&D facility in Chennai, India. Reynold Pens, along with Paper-Mate and Parker, are brands owned by US based Newell Brands and are sold in more than 70 countries.
