= Ohto =

Writing utensil company

Ohto Co., Ltd.
- Formerly: Nakata-Ohka-do (1919–49); Auto (1949–74); Ohto (1974–present)
- Type: Limited
- Industry: Writing instruments
- Founded: 1919; 107 years ago
- Founder: Nakata Touzaburo
- Headquarters: Japan
- Products: Fountain, rollerball, and gel pens, refills, and mechanical pencils
- Website: ohto.co.jp

Ohto Co., Ltd. (オート株式会社, Ōto Kabushiki Gaisha) is a Japanese manufacturing company of writing implements. The company was established in 1919 as a manufacturer of dyes and ink. In 1949, the company became a pen manufacturer after they manufactured the world's first ball point pen with a chrome ball. This was also Japan's first ballpoint pen.

Current products manufactured by Ohto are fountain, rollerball, and gel pens, their refills, and mechanical pencils.

== History ==
The story of Ohto started when Nakata Touzaburo, an employee of the Ministry of Finance, invented a special ink, which he thought would be perfect for use in banknotes. After his idea was rejected by the Ministry, Touzaburo decide to establish a company by himself, establishing "Nakata-Ohka-do" in 1919 as a manufacturer of ink, setting up in Tokyo.

When the United States Army (that had occupied Japan after the World War II) brought ballpoint pens with them, Japanese people were amazed by them and their long-lasting ink system, since ballpoints did not need to be refilled as often as fountain pens. Nakata took note of this, and in 1949 Nakata-Ohka-do released the first ballpoint pen made in Japan, named "Auto pencil". It also became the world's first pencil-shaped ballpoint pen with chrome ball. To match its own invention, the company also renamed to "Auto".

In the 1960s, Ohto also released the first water-based ballpoint pen, thus establishing a new category of pens: rollerball pens. In 1974, the company realised that the word "Auto" was too closely associated with cars, and changed its name again to "Ohto".
