= Mon Ami =

Mon Ami may refer to:

- Mon Ami, one of the names MV Fosdyke Trader, a 411 GRT Empire F type coaster, received
- "Mon Ami", a 2019 song by Kurdish-German rapper Eno
- "Mon Ami", a 2020 song by German rapper Samra
- "Mon Ami", a 2021 song by Russian singer Tatyana Mezhentseva representing Russia in the Junior Eurovision Song Contest 2021
- Monami, a Korean office supply company
