= Ballpoint pen =

Device dispensing ink over a metal ball at its point

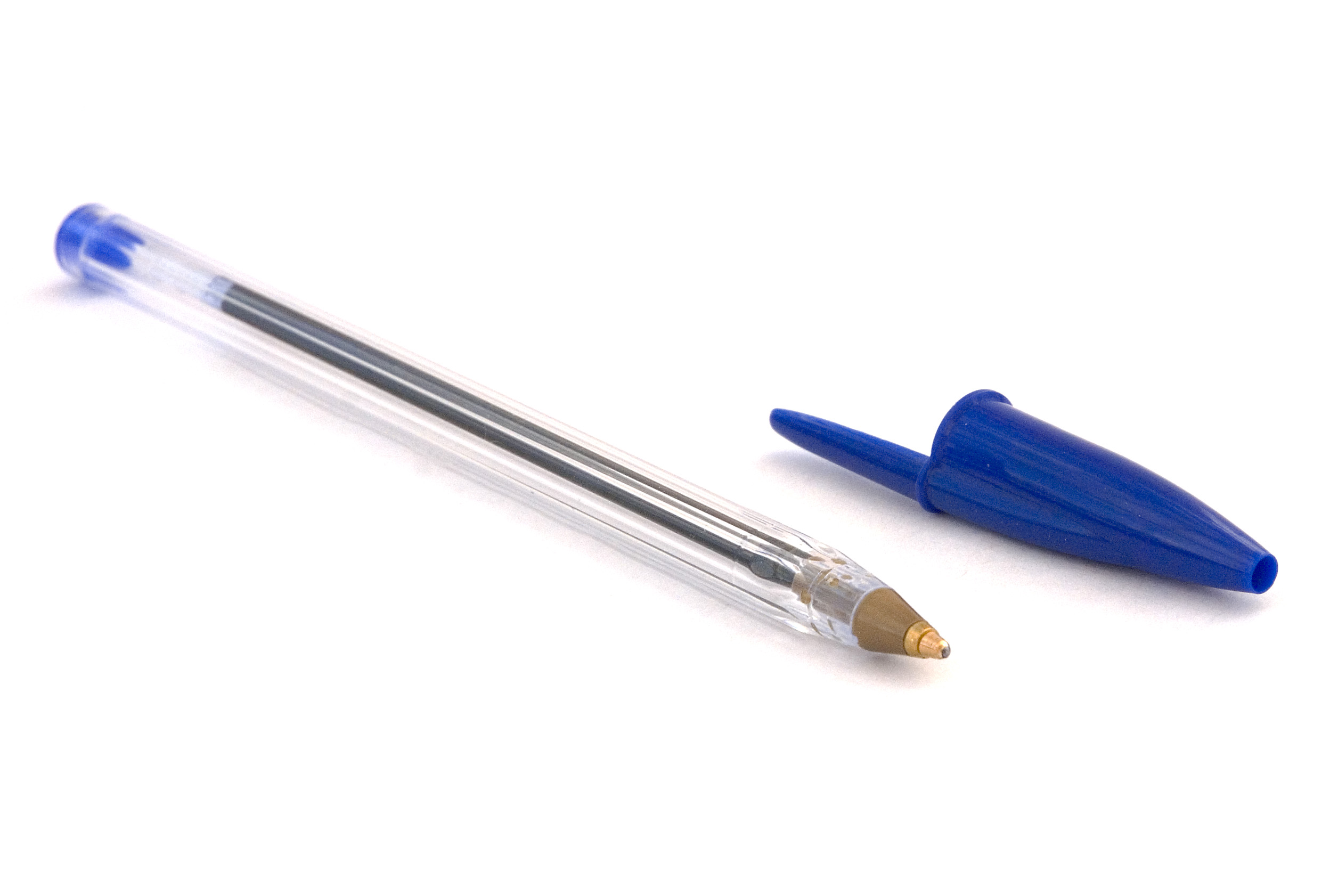
- A Bic Cristal, the world's best-selling pen
- Type: Pen
- Inventor: John J. Loud (Note: Loud invented the ballpoint pen in 1888 and patented it on 30 October that year. Later, Hungarian inventor László Bíró patented what is known as the "modern" ballpoint pen in France and the United Kingdom in 1938.)
- Inception: 1888; 138 years ago
- Manufacturer: List: AIHAO; Ballograf; Berol; Bic; Caran d'Ache; Conway Stewart; Cross; Deli; Herlitz; Kaweco; Kokuyo Camlin; Lamy; M&G Stationery; Maped; Monami; Montblanc; Ohto; Paper Mate; Parker; Pelikan; Pierre Cardin; Pilot; Reynolds; Sailor; Sakura; Sheaffer; Stabilo; Scripto; Staedtler; Tombow; TOZ Penkala; Uni-ball; Yard-O-Led; Zebra
- Available: Yes

A ballpoint pen (Note: Also known as a biro (British English), ball pen (Bangladeshi, Hong Kong, Indian, Indonesian, Pakistani, Japanese, and Philippine English), or dot pen (Nepali English and South Asian English).) is a pen that dispenses ink (usually in paste form) over a hard ball rolling in its point. The materials commonly used are steel, brass, or tungsten carbide. The design was conceived and developed as a cleaner and more reliable alternative to dip pens and fountain pens. It is now the world's most-used writing instrument, with millions manufactured and sold daily. It has influenced art and graphic design and spawned an artwork genre.

== History ==
=== Origins ===
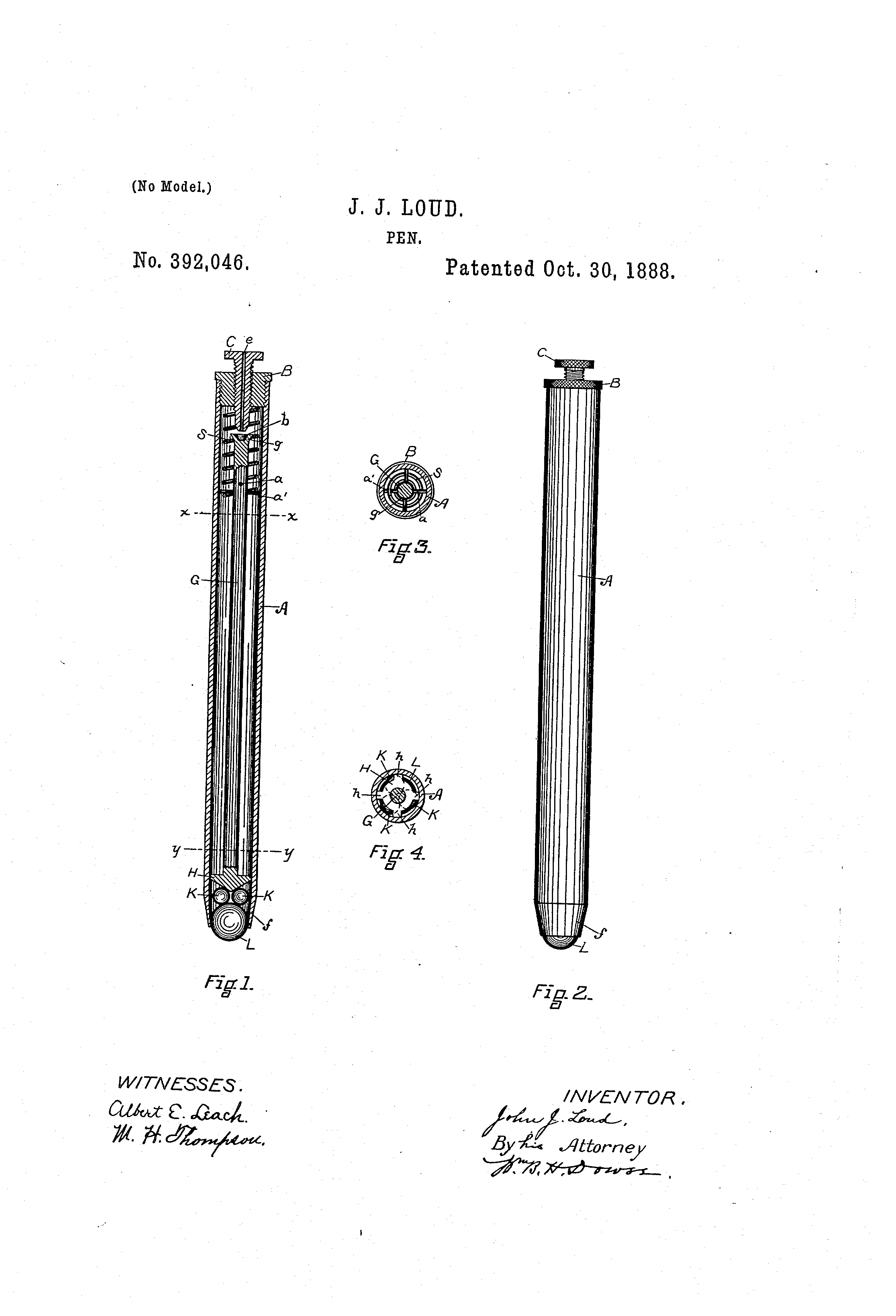
Loud's patent of the ballpoint pen (1888)

The first patent for a ballpoint pen was issued on 30 October 1888 to American inventor John J. Loud, who was attempting to make a writing instrument that would be able to write "on rough surfaces—such as wood, coarse wrapping paper, and other articles"—which fountain pens could not. Loud's pen had a small rotating steel ball held in place by a socket. Loud intended his invention for marking boxes and packaging, not for precision or detail, and it proved too coarse for letter-writing. With no commercial viability, its potential went unexploited, and the patent eventually lapsed.

The manufacture of economical, reliable ballpoint pens as known today arose from experimentation, modern chemistry, and the precision manufacturing capabilities of the early 20th century. Patents filed worldwide during early development are testaments to failed attempts at making the pens commercially viable and widely available. Early ballpoints did not deliver the ink evenly; overflow and clogging were among the obstacles faced by early inventors. If the ball socket was too tight or the ink too thick, it would not reach the paper. If the socket was too loose or the ink too thin, the pen would leak, or the ink would smear. Ink reservoirs pressurized by a piston, spring, capillary action, and gravity would all serve as solutions to ink-delivery and flow problems.

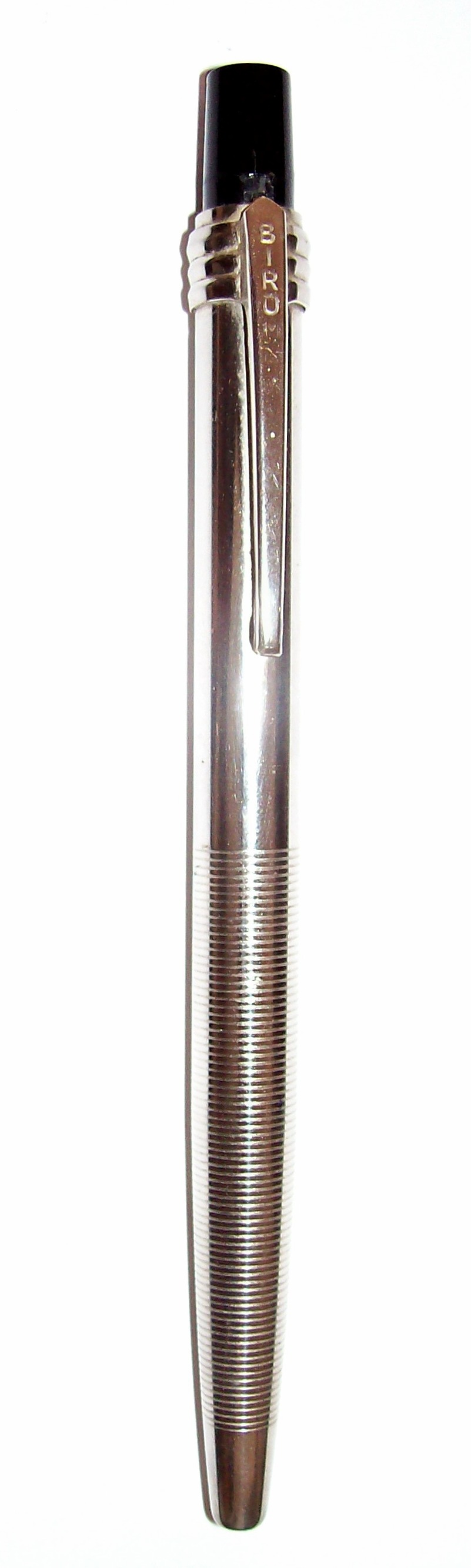
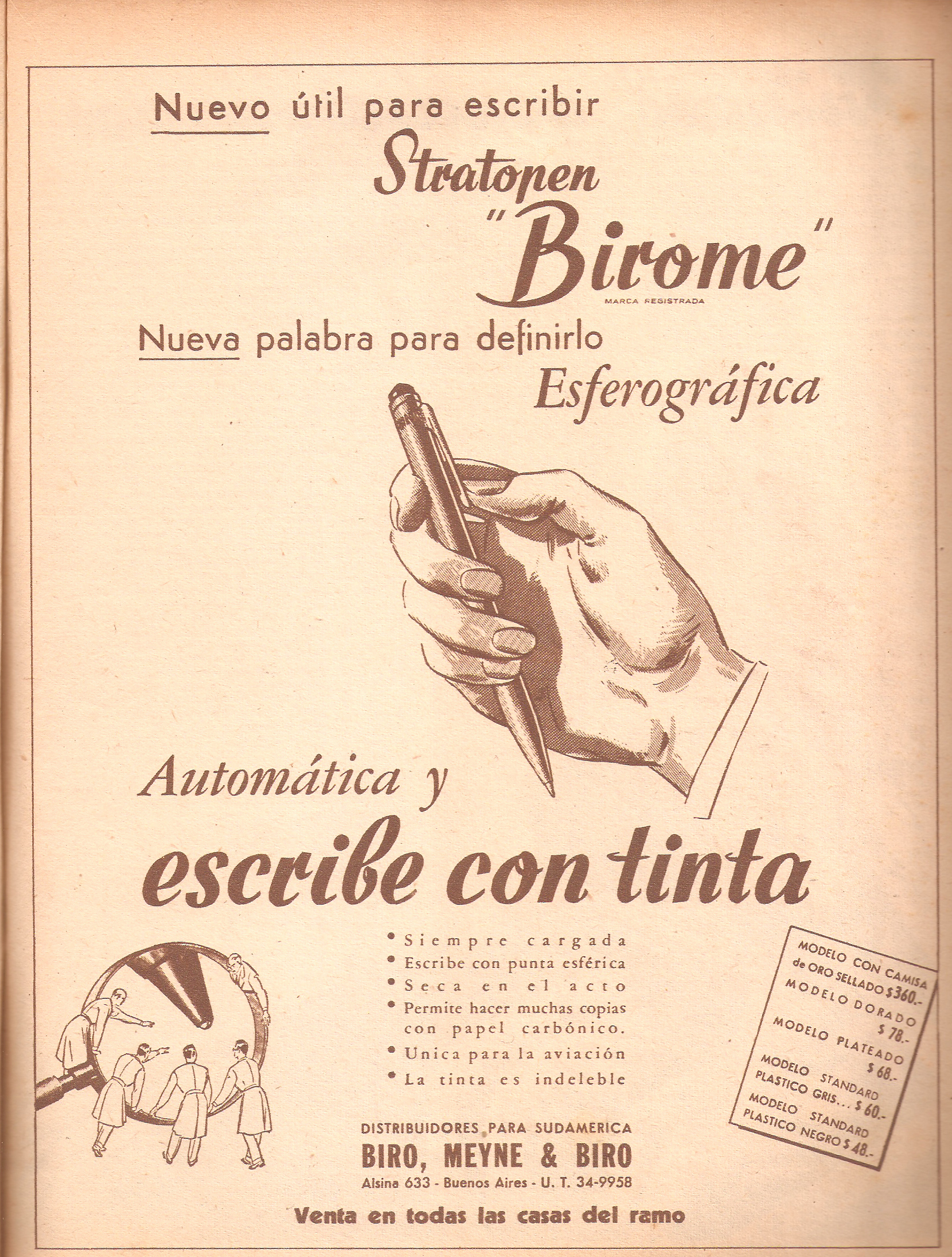
At left, an authentic Birome made in Argentina by Bíró & Meyne. On the right is a "Birome" advertisement from 1945

László Bíró, a Hungarian newspaper editor (later a naturalized Argentine) frustrated by the amount of time that he wasted filling up fountain pens and cleaning up smudged pages, noticed that inks used in newspaper printing dried quickly, leaving the paper dry and smudge-free. He decided to create a pen using the same type of ink. Bíró enlisted the help of his brother György, a dentist with useful knowledge of chemistry, to develop viscous ink formulae for new ballpoint designs.

Bíró's innovation successfully coupled viscous ink with a ball-and-socket mechanism that allowed controlled flow while preventing ink from drying inside the reservoir. Bíró filed for a British patent on 15 June 1938.

In 1941, the Bíró brothers and a friend, Juan Jorge Meyne, fled Germany and moved to Argentina, where they formed "Bíró Pens of Argentina" and filed a new patent in 1943. Their pen was sold in Argentina as the "Birome", from the names Bíró and Meyne, which is how ballpoint pens are still known in that country. This new design was licensed by the British engineer Frederick George Miles and manufactured by his company Miles Aircraft, to be used by Royal Air Force aircrew as the "Biro". Ballpoint pens were found to be more versatile than fountain pens, especially in airplanes, where fountain pens were prone to leak.

Bíró's patent, and other early patents on ballpoint pens, often used the term "ball-point fountain pen".

=== Postwar proliferation ===
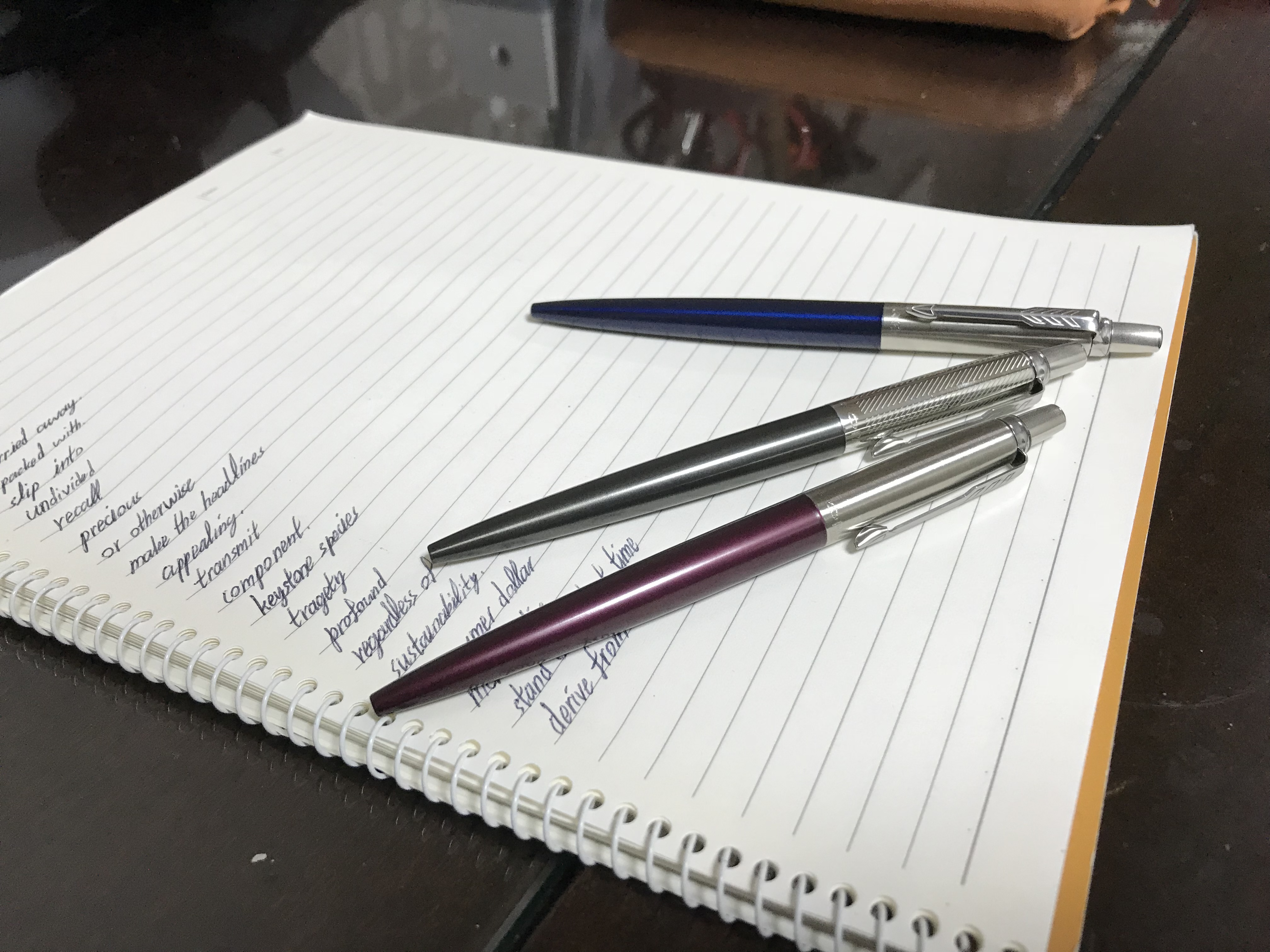
2018 Parker Jotters are similar to the version that first came out in 1954

Following World War II, many companies vied to commercially produce their own ballpoint pen design. In pre-war Argentina, success of the Birome ballpoint was limited, but in mid-1945, the Eversharp Co., a maker of mechanical pencils, teamed up with Eberhard Faber Co. to license the rights from Birome for sales in the United States.

In 1946, a Spanish firm, Vila Sivill Hermanos, began to make a ballpoint, Regia Continua, and from 1953 to 1957 their factory also made Bic ballpoints, on contract with the French firm Société Bic.

During the same period, American entrepreneur Milton Reynolds came across a Birome ballpoint pen during a business trip to Buenos Aires, Argentina. Recognizing commercial potential, he purchased several ballpoint samples, returned to the United States, and founded the Reynolds International Pen Company. Reynolds bypassed the Birome patent with sufficient design alterations to obtain an American patent, beating Eversharp and other competitors to introduce the pen to the US market. Debuting at Gimbels department store in New York City on 29 October 1945, for US$12.50 each (1945 US dollar value, about $224 in 2025 dollars), "Reynolds Rocket" became the first commercially successful ballpoint pen. Reynolds went to great extremes to market the pen, with great success; Gimbel's sold many thousands of pens within one week. In Britain, the Miles-(Harry) Martin pen company was producing the first commercially successful ballpoint pens there by the end of 1945.

Neither Reynolds' nor Eversharp's ballpoint lived up to consumer expectations in America. Ballpoint pen sales peaked in 1946, and consumer interest subsequently plunged due to market saturation, going from luxury good to fungible consumable. By the early 1950s the ballpoint boom had subsided and Reynolds' company folded.

Paper Mate pens, among the emerging ballpoint brands of the 1950s, bought the rights to distribute their own ballpoint pens in Canada. Facing concerns about ink-reliability, Paper Mate pioneered new ink formulas and advertised them as "banker-approved". In 1954, Parker Pens released "The Jotter"—the company's first ballpoint—boasting additional features and technological advances which also included the use of tungsten-carbide textured ball-bearings in their pens. In less than a year, Parker sold several million pens at prices between three and nine dollars. In the 1960s, the failing Eversharp Co. sold its pen division to Parker and ultimately folded.

Marcel Bich also introduced a ballpoint pen to the American marketplace in the 1950s, licensed from Bíró and based on the Argentine designs. Bich shortened his name to Bic in 1953, forming the ballpoint brand Bic now recognized globally. Bic pens struggled until the company launched its "Writes First Time, Every Time!" advertising campaign in the 1960s. Competition during this era forced unit prices to drop considerably.

=== Production in China ===
Many industrial sites specializing in pen production were created in China. One important production site is the Fenshui Township. Their ballpoint pen production started in 1974, when the Hangzhou Ballpoint Pen Factory initiated its production using bamboo. The Wengang Township has a long tradition of brush pen production, but all kinds of pens are produced, including ballpoint pens. In 2002, China's Pen Capital was constructed in Wenzhou, with an investment of ¥ 600 million. AIHAO was one of the first companies to move to the industrial site. Their most famous product is the ball-point pen.

In the 2000s, China ballpoint pen production skyrocketed. In 2017, China produced 38 billion ballpoint pens per year, 80% of the global market. But the country had a problem in precision engineering the ballpoint pen tip, which had to be imported from Germany, Switzerland, and Japan for the cost of ¥120 million a year. The subject was criticized by western media. Forbes argued that the lack of IP protections were the cause of it, as the country wouldn't attract investments in innovation. Financial Times argued that because of Chinese self-sufficiency policy, companies handled the entire supply chain by themselves, thus creating inefficiency. Hong Kong Economic Journal declared that "the day China can produce a 100% homemade ball pen will be the day it truly qualifies as a first-class industrial power".

Since 2011, the Ministry of Science and Technology invested $8.7 million in the production of the tips. Beifa Group worked with Taiyuan Iron & Steel Group (TISCO) with no success. In 2016, the Chinese Premier Li Keqiang complained on national television about the quality of Chinese pens. In June 2016, TISCO produced the first national ballpoint pen. In November, TISCO's industry standard was approved by the China Metallurgical Standardization Research Institute and on 10 January 2017 the pens were officially announced. The achievement reached the front-page news, was discussed in talk shows and celebrated on social media.

== Inks ==
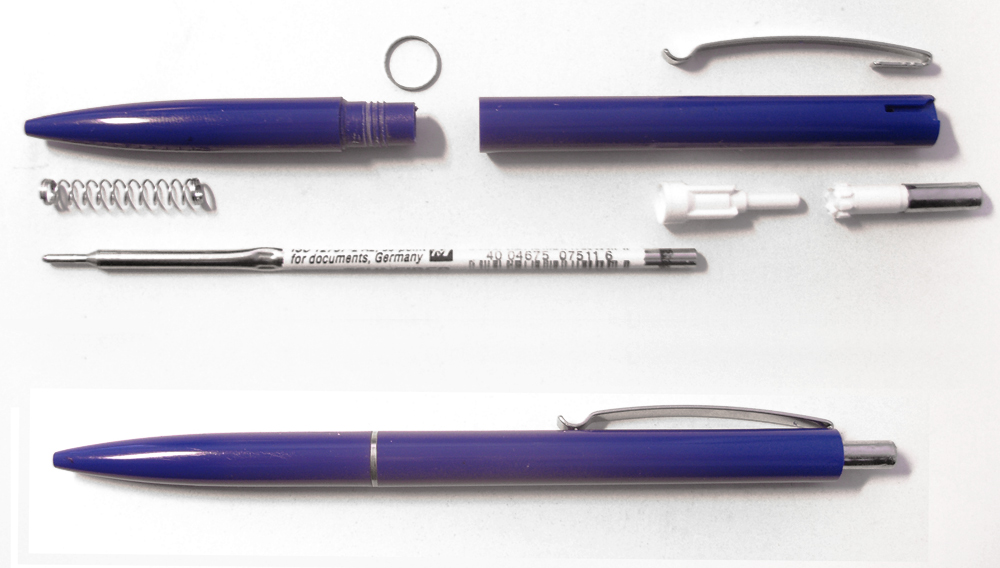
A retractable ballpoint pen assemblage (Schneider K15)

Movement of the ball in a ballpoint pen

Ballpoint pen ink is normally a paste containing around 25 to 40 percent dye. The dyes are suspended in a mixture of solvents and fatty acids. The most common of the solvents are benzyl alcohol or phenoxyethanol, which mix with the dyes and oils to create a smooth paste that dries quickly. This type of ink is also called "oil-based ink". The fatty acids help to lubricate the ball tip while writing. Hybrid inks also contain added lubricants in the ink to provide a smoother writing experience. The drying time of the ink varies depending upon the viscosity of the ink and the diameter of the ball.

In general, the more viscous the ink, the faster it will dry, but more writing pressure needs to be applied to dispense ink. Although they are less viscous, hybrid inks have a faster drying time compared to normal ballpoint inks. Also, a larger ball dispenses more ink and thus increases drying time.

The dyes used in blue and black ballpoint pens are basic dyes based on triarylmethane and acid dyes derived from diazo compounds or phthalocyanine. Common dyes in blue (and black) ink are Prussian blue, Victoria blue, methyl violet, crystal violet, and phthalocyanine blue. The dye eosin is commonly used for red ink.

The inks are resistant to water after drying but can be defaced by certain solvents which include acetone and various alcohols.

The gradual evaporation of volatile solvents, particularly 2-phenoxyethanol, can be used in forensic document examination to study the ageing of ink strokes. Gas chromatography-mass spectrometry (GC-MS) can measure changes in the concentration of such solvents over time, allowing forensic analysts to estimate the relative age of some ink marks and potentially assess the chronology of entries in a document.

== Types of ballpoint pens ==
A Ystudio ballpoint pen completely disassembled to show the inner brass mechanics and rare double spring system, with optional custom engraving.

A Ystudio Classic Revolve Brassing Black Ballpoint pen, shown fully reassembled showing manufacturer's logo on opposite side.

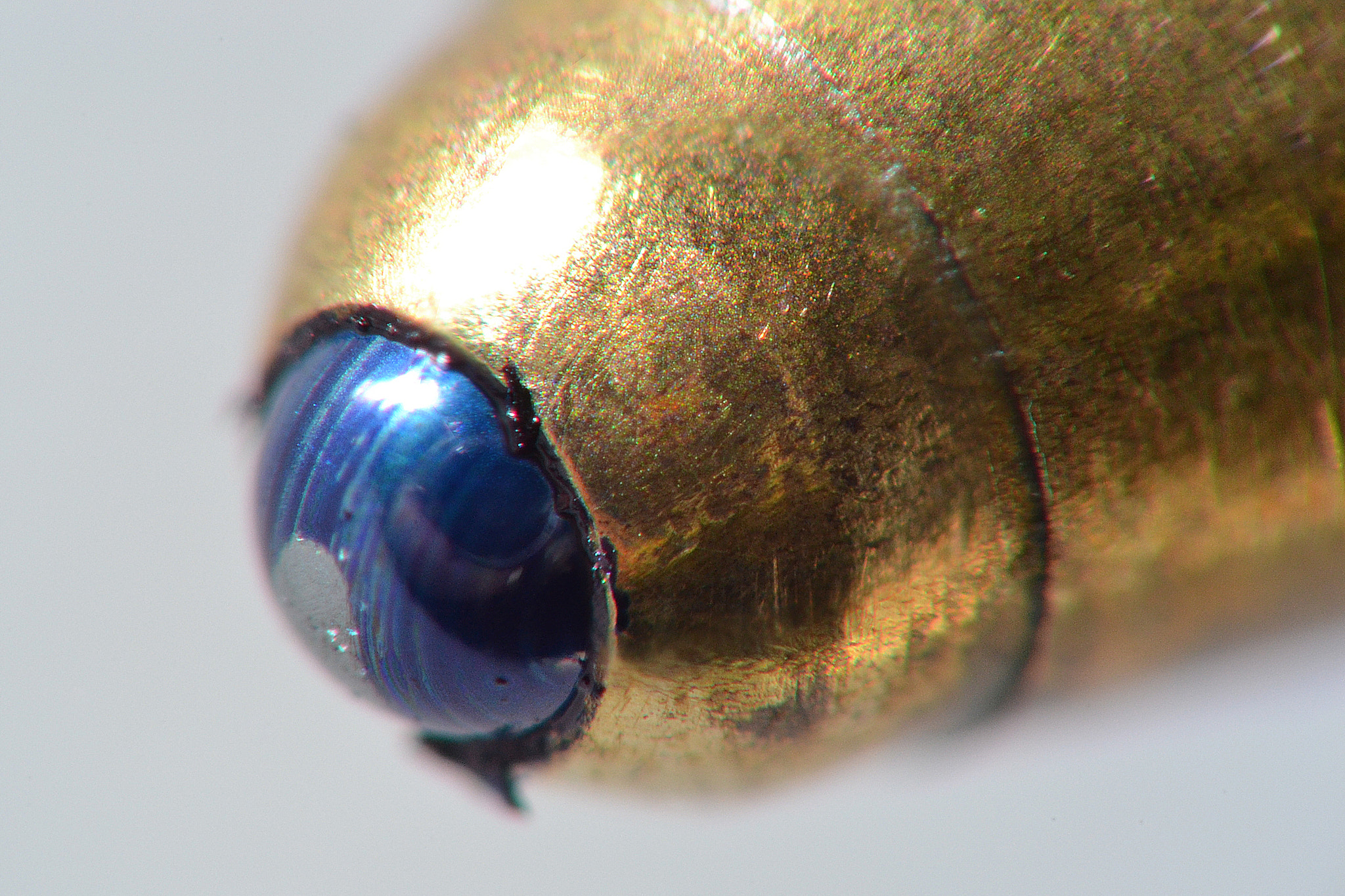
Magnified tip of a ballpoint pen

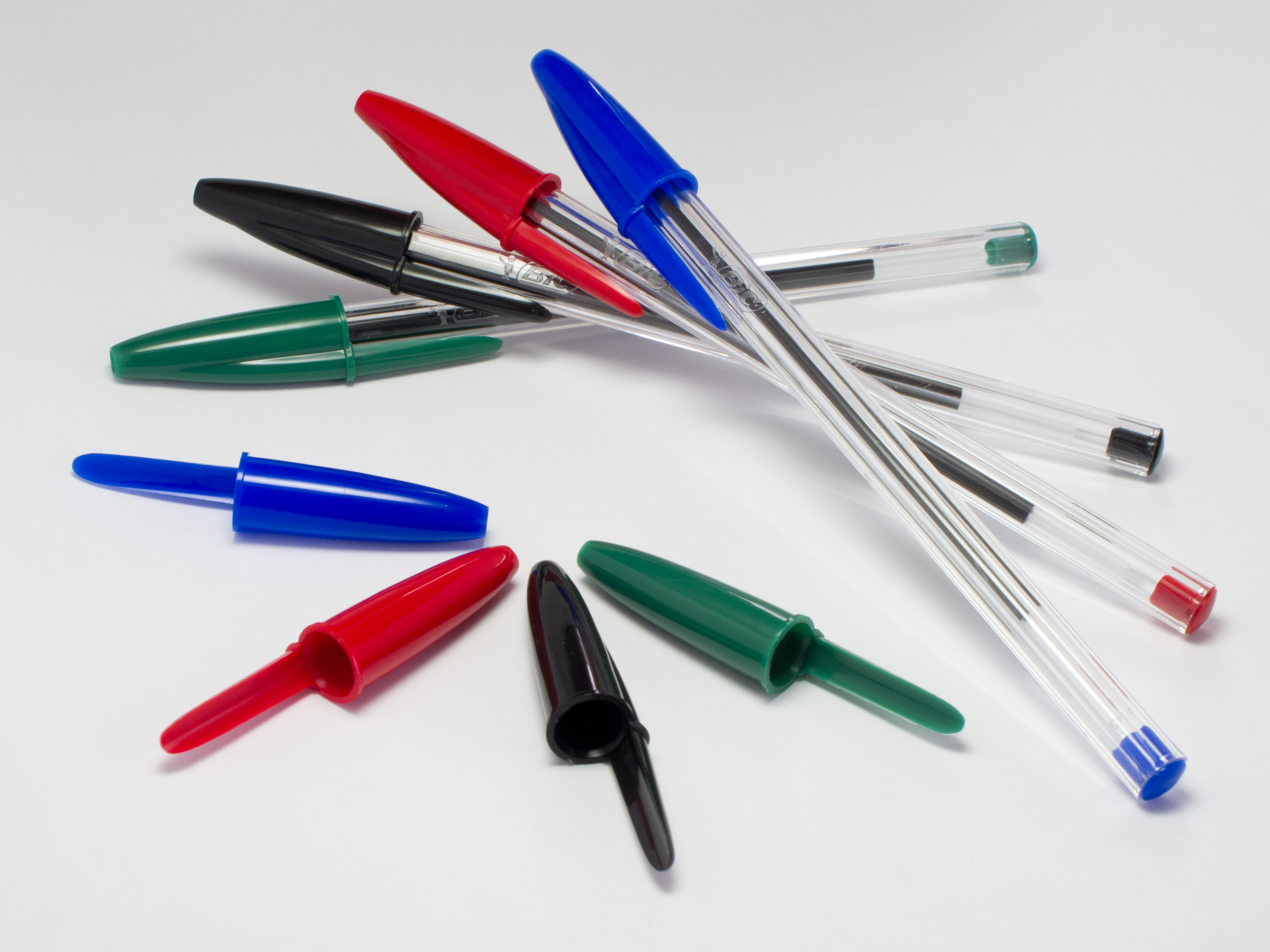
Bic Cristal ballpoint pens shown in four basic ink colors

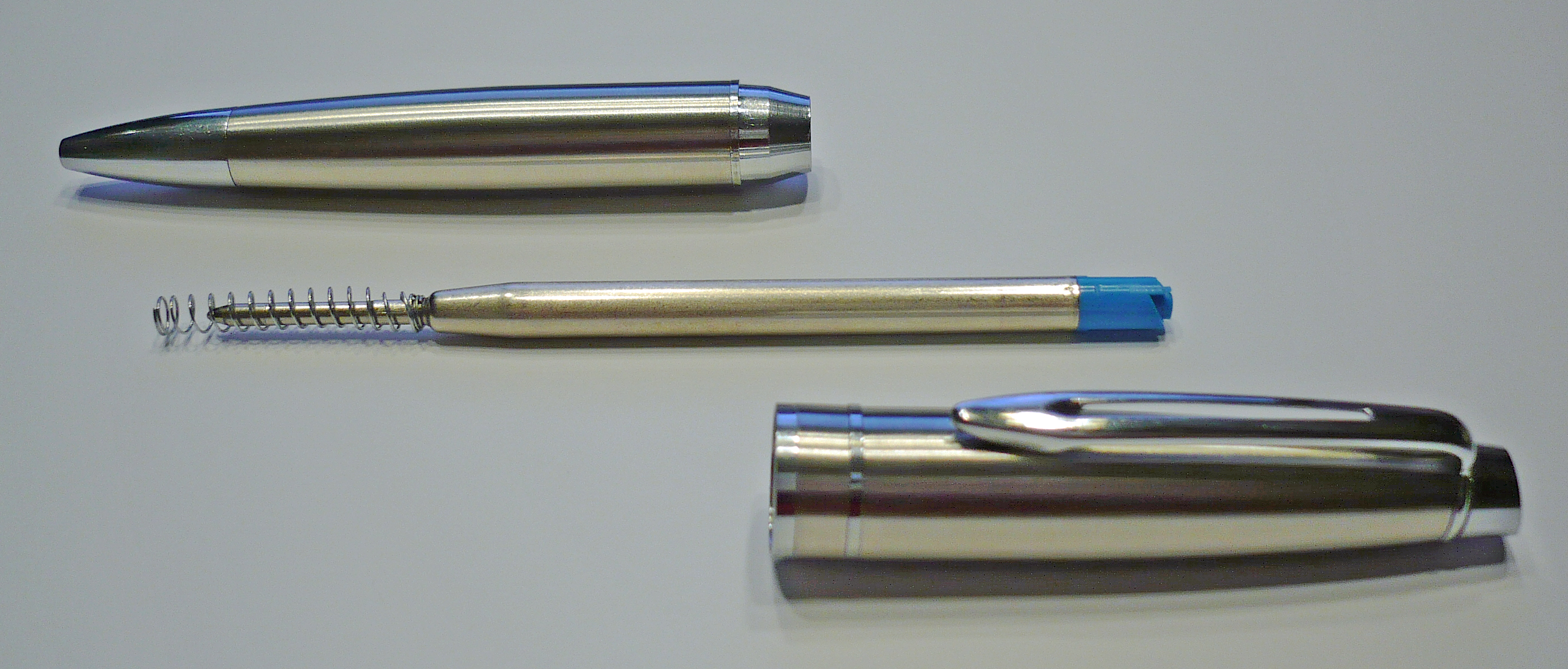
Twist action ballpoint pen with large capacity G2 type refill. Model: Jinhao 182, resembling the Waterman Expert Stainless Steel

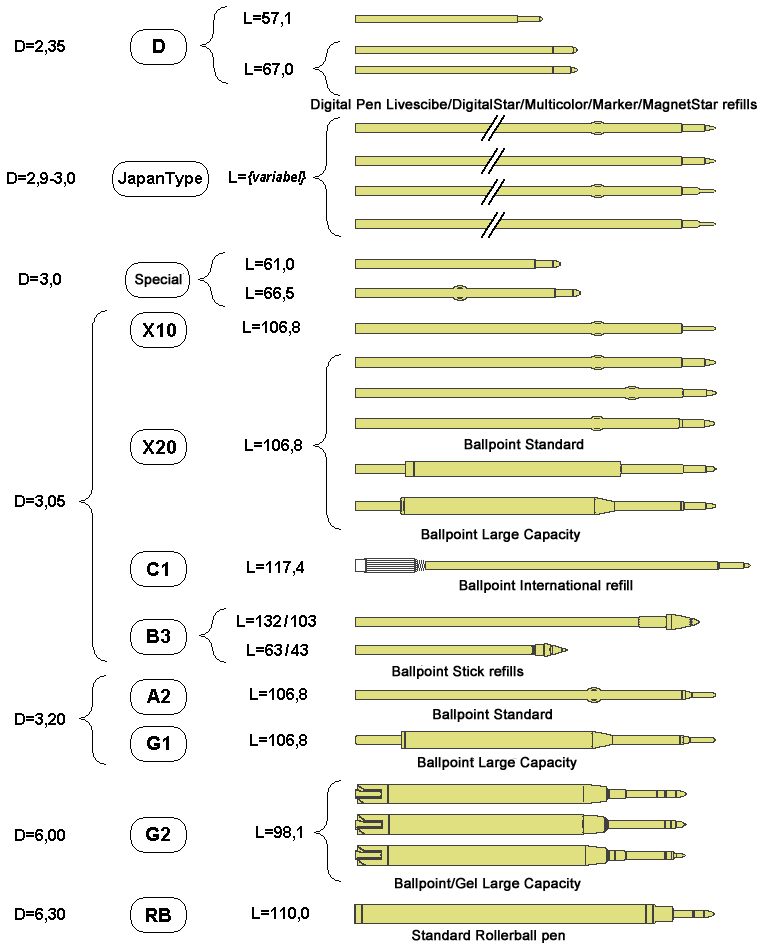
Commonly used ballpoint refill types (diameter and length given in millimeters)

Ballpoint pens are produced in both disposable and refillable models. Refills allow for the entire internal ink reservoir, including a ballpoint and socket, to be replaced. Such characteristics are usually associated with designer-type pens or those constructed of finer materials. The simplest types of ballpoint pens are disposable and have a cap to cover the tip when the pen is not in use, or a mechanism for retracting the tip, which varies between manufacturers but is usually a spring- or screw-mechanism.

Rollerball pens employ the same ballpoint mechanics, but with the use of water-based inks instead of oil-based inks. Compared to oil-based ballpoints, rollerball pens are said to provide more fluid ink-flow, but the water-based inks will blot if the pen is held stationary against the writing surface. Water-based inks also remain wet longer when freshly applied and are thus prone to "smearing"—posing problems to left-handed people (or right handed people writing right-to-left script)—and "running", should the writing surface become wet.

Some ballpoint pens use a hybrid ink formulation whose viscosity is lower than that of standard ballpoint ink, but greater than rollerball ink. The ink dries faster than a gel pen to prevent smearing when writing. These pens are better suited for left-handed persons. Examples are the Zebra Surari, Uni-ball Jetstream and Pilot Acroball ranges. These pens are also labelled "extra smooth", as they offer a smoother writing experience compared to normal ballpoint pens.

Ballpoint pens with erasable ink were pioneered by the Paper Mate pen company. The ink formulas of erasable ballpoints have properties similar to rubber cement, allowing the ink to be literally rubbed clean from the writing surface before drying and eventually becoming permanent. Erasable ink is much thicker than standard ballpoint inks, requiring pressurized cartridges to facilitate inkflow—meaning they can also write upside-down. Though these pens are equipped with erasers, any eraser will suffice.

Ballpoint tips are fitted with balls whose diameter can vary from 0.28 mm to 1.6 mm. The ball diameter does not correspond to the width of the line produced by the pen. The line width depends on various factors like the type of ink and pressure applied. Some standard ball diameters are: 0.3 mm, 0.38 mm, 0.4 mm, 0.5 mm, 0.7 mm (fine), 0.8 mm, 1.0 mm (medium), 1.2 mm and 1.4 mm (broad). Pens with ball diameters as small as 0.18 mm have been made by Japanese companies, but are extremely rare.

The inexpensive, disposable Bic Cristal (also simply "Bic pen" or "Biro") is reportedly the most widely sold pen in the world. It was the Bic company's first product and is still synonymous with the company name.

The Bic Cristal is part of the permanent collection at the Museum of Modern Art (MoMA), acknowledged for its industrial design. The design features in MoMA's Pirouette: Turning Points in Design, a 2025 exhibition of "widely recognized design icons [...] highlighting pivotal moments in design history."

Its hexagonal barrel mimics that of a wooden pencil and is transparent, showing the ink level in the reservoir. Originally a sealed streamlined cap, the modern pen cap has a small hole at the top to meet safety standards, helping to prevent suffocation if children suck it into the throat.

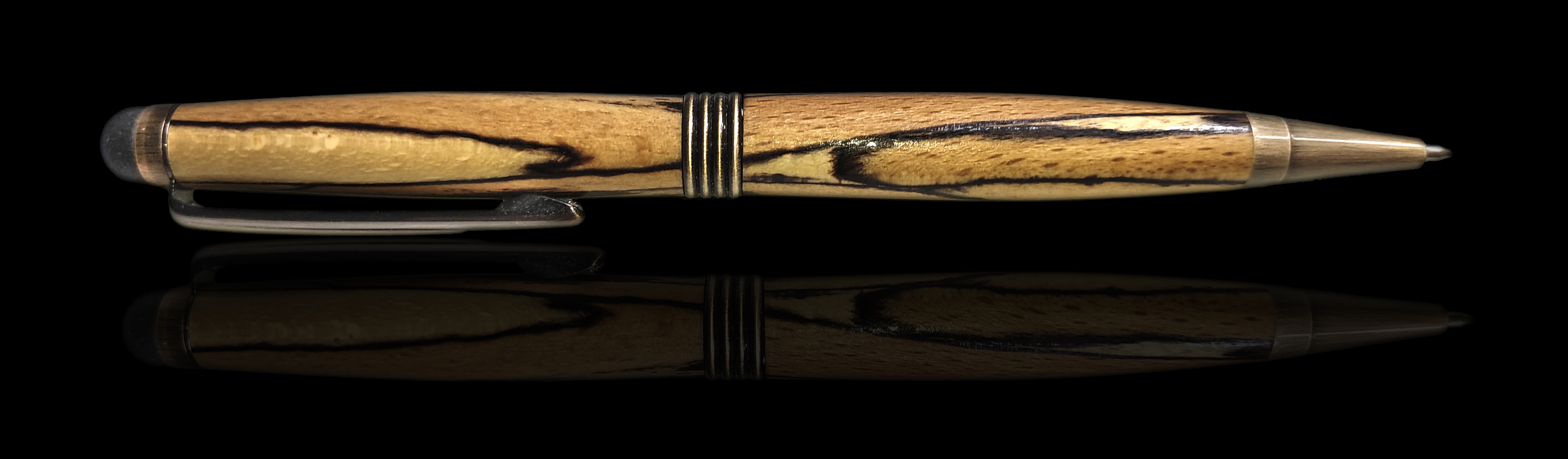
Designer created ballpoint pen with case made of wood showing induced fungal decay

Multi-pens are pens that feature multiple varying colored pen refills. Sometimes ballpoint refills are combined with another non-ballpoint refill, usually a mechanical pencil. Sometimes ballpoint pens combine a ballpoint tip on one end and touchscreen stylus on the other.

Ballpoint pens are sometimes provided free by businesses, such as hotels and banks, printed with a company's name and logo. Ballpoints have also been produced to commemorate events, such as a pen commemorating the 1963 assassination of President John F. Kennedy. These pens, known as "advertising pens," are the same as standard ballpoint pen models, but have become valued among collectors.

Sometimes ballpoint pens are also produced as design objects. With cases made of metal or wood, they become individually styled utility objects.

The Pilot Frixion pen has temperature-senstive thermochromic ink and comes with a rubber eraser. When the eraser is rubbed against the ink, the friction created heats the ink and turns it transparent. The ink can be made opaque again by exposing it to temperatures lower than 20 degrees celsius.

== Use of ballpoint pens in space ==
It is generally believed that gravity is needed to coat the ball with ink. In fact most ballpoint pens on the Earth do not work when writing upside-down because the Earth's gravity pulls the ink inside the pen away from the tip of the pen. However, in the microgravity environment of space a regular ballpoint pen can still work, pointed in any direction, because the capillary forces in the ink are stronger than non present gravitational forces. The functionality of a regular ballpoint pen in space was confirmed by ESA astronaut Pedro Duque in 2003.

Technology developed by Fisher pens in the United States resulted in the production of what came to be known as the "Fisher Space Pen". Space Pens combine a more viscous ink with a pressurized ink reservoir that forces the ink toward the point. Unlike a standard ballpoint's ink container, the rear end of a Space Pen's pressurized reservoir is sealed, eliminating evaporation and leakage, thus allowing the pen to write upside-down, in zero-gravity environments, and underwater. Astronauts have made use of these pens in outer space.

== As an art medium ==
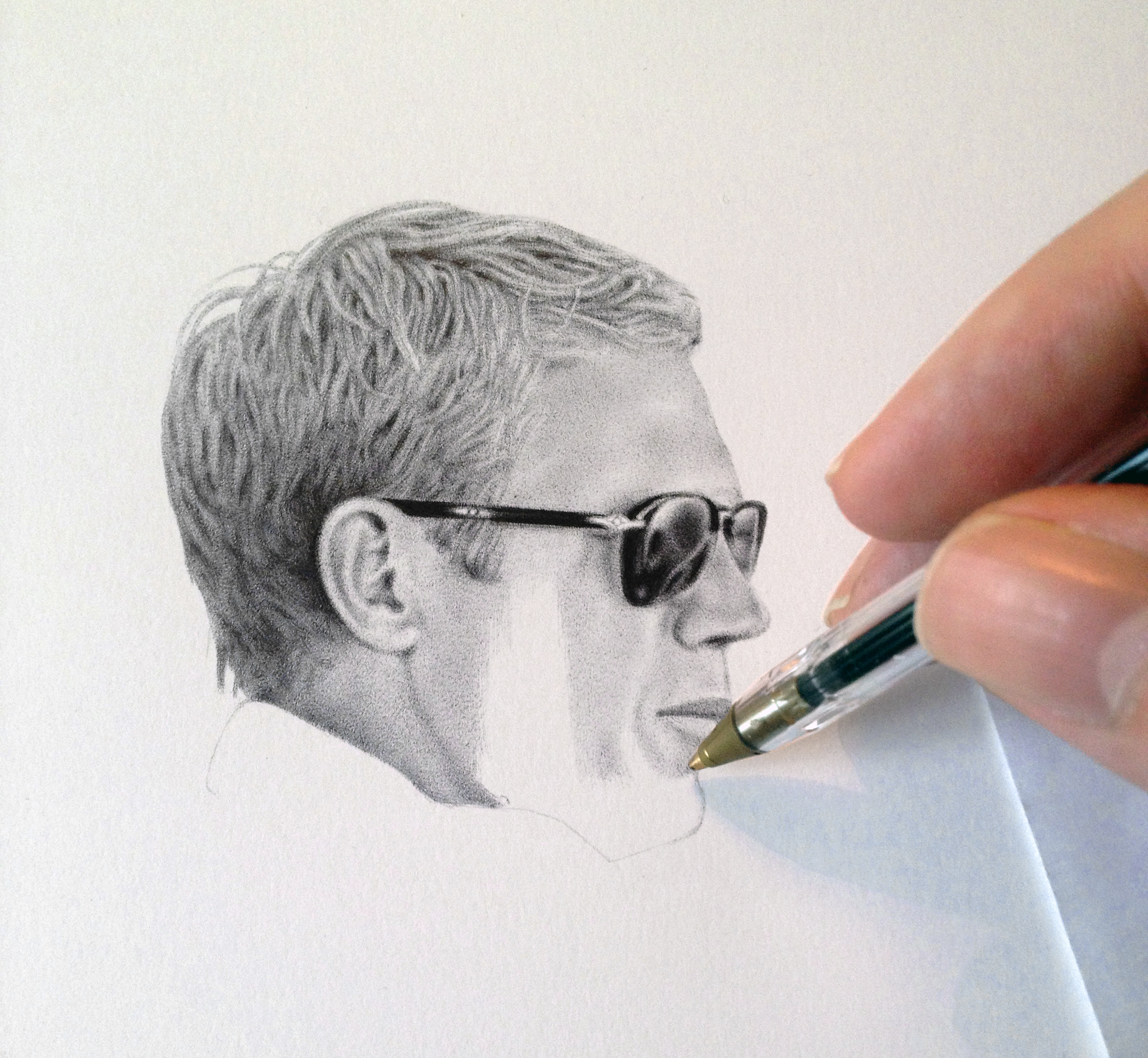
Example of a ballpoint pen work-in-progress – rendering of actor Steve McQueen by artist James Mylne

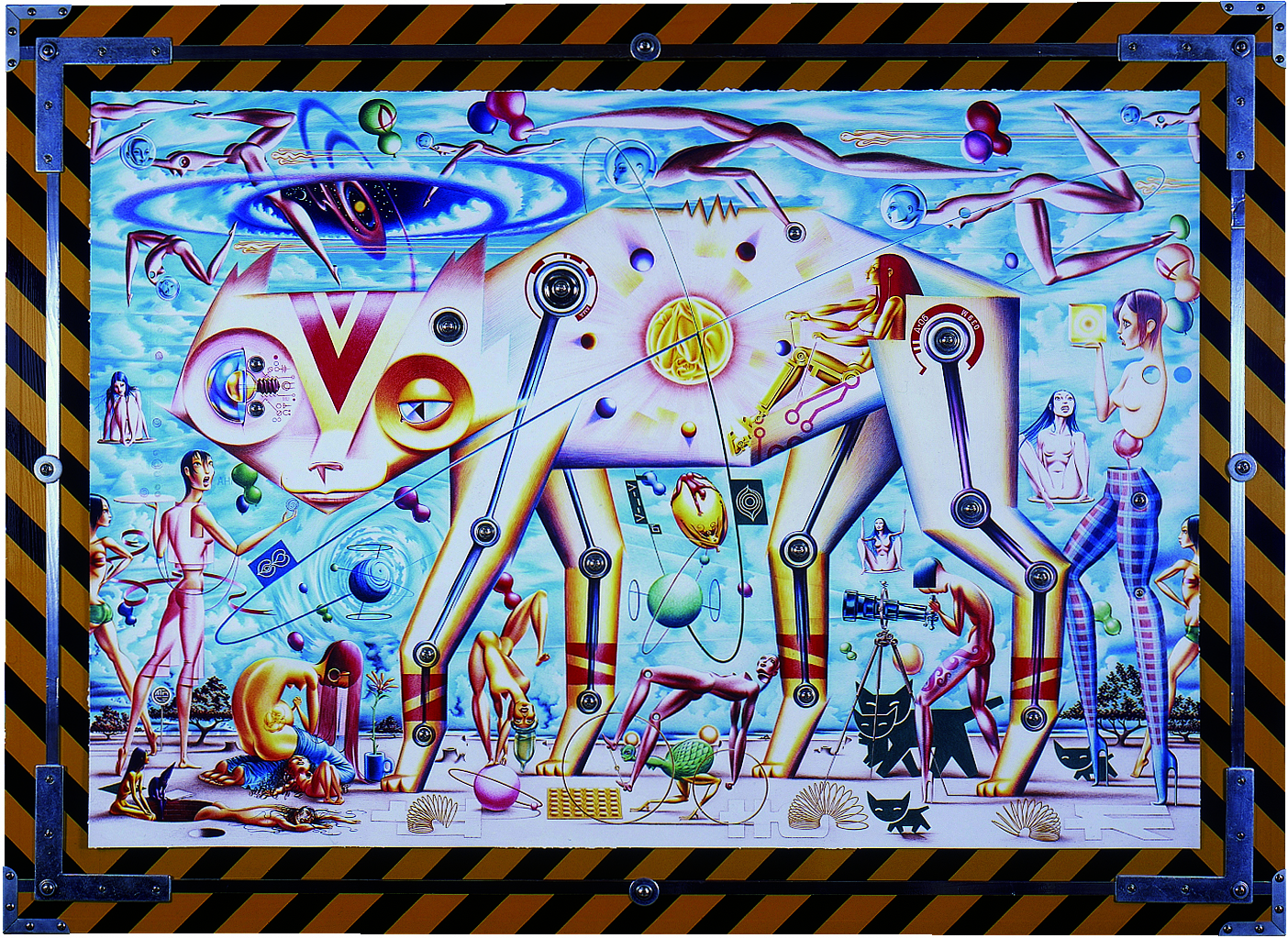
Ballpoint "PENting" by Lennie Mace, Uchuu Neko Parade (2005) ballpoint pen and hardware on paper

The ballpoint pen has proven to be a versatile art medium for both professional artists and amateur doodlers. Low cost, availability, and portability are cited by practitioners as qualities which make this common writing tool a convenient art supply. Some artists use them within mixed-media works, while others use them solely as their medium-of-choice.

Effects not generally associated with ballpoint pens can be achieved. Traditional pen-and-ink techniques such as stippling and cross-hatching can be used to create half-tones or the illusion of form and volume. For artists whose interests necessitate precision line-work, ballpoints are an obvious attraction; ballpoint pens allow for sharp lines not as effectively executed using a brush. Finely applied, the resulting imagery has been mistaken for airbrushed artwork and photography, causing reactions of disbelief which ballpoint artist Lennie Mace refers to as the "Wow Factor".

Famous 20th-century artists, including Andy Warhol, have utilized the ballpoint pen during their careers. Ballpoint pen artwork continues to attract interest in the 21st century, with many contemporary artists gaining recognition for their specific use of ballpoint pens as a medium. Korean-American artist Il Lee has been creating large-scale, abstract artwork since the late 1970s solely with ballpoint pens. Since the 1980s, Lennie Mace creates imaginative, ballpoint-only artwork of varying content and complexity, applied to unconventional surfaces including wood and denim. The artist coined terms such as "PENtings" and "Media Graffiti" to describe his varied output. British artist James Mylne has been creating photo-realistic artwork using mostly black ballpoints, sometimes with minimal mixed-media color.

The ballpoint pen has several limitations as an art medium. Color availability and sensitivity of ink to light are among concerns of ballpoint pen artists. As a tool that uses ink, marks made with a ballpoint pen can generally not be erased. Additionally, "blobbing" ink on the drawing surface and "skipping" ink-flow require consideration when drawing with a ballpoint pen. Although the mechanics of ballpoint pens remain relatively unchanged, ink composition has evolved to solve certain problems over the years, resulting in unpredictable sensitivity to light and some extent of fading.

== Manufacturing ==
The common ballpoint pen is a product of mass production, with components produced separately on assembly lines. Basic steps in the manufacturing process include the production of ink formulas, molding of metal and plastic components, and assembly. Marcel Bich (leading to Société Bic) was involved in developing the production of inexpensive ballpoint pens.

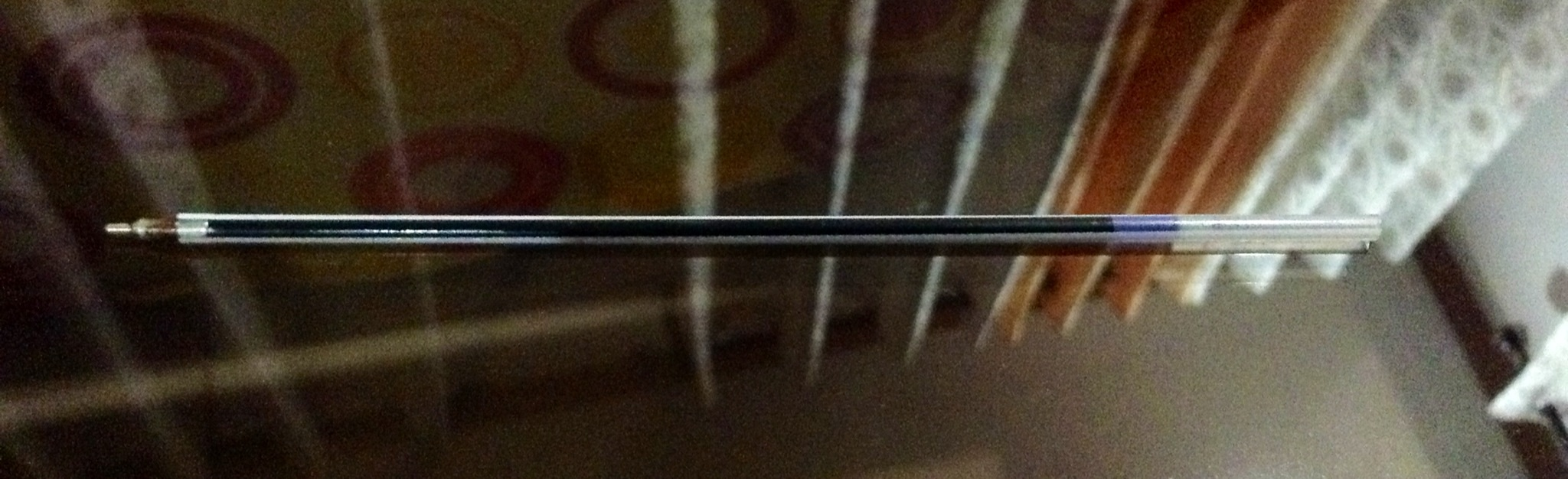
The ink holder of a disposable ballpoint pen

Although designs and construction vary between brands, basic components of all ballpoint pens are universal. The making of a ballpoint pen, specially the tip, is considered a work of precision engineering. Standard components of a ballpoint tip include the freely rotating "ball" itself (distributing the ink on the writing surface), a "socket" holding the ball in place, small "ink channels" that provide ink to the ball through the socket, and a self-contained "ink reservoir" supplying ink to the ball. In modern disposable pens, narrow plastic tubes contain the ink, which is compelled downward to the ball by gravity. Brass, steel, or tungsten carbide are used to manufacture the ball bearing-like points, then housed in a brass socket.

The function of these components can be observed at a larger scale in the ball-applicator of roll-on antiperspirant. The ballpoint tip delivers the ink to the writing surface while acting as a "buffer" between the ink in the reservoir and the air outside, preventing the quick-drying ink from drying inside the reservoir. Modern ballpoints are said to have a two-year shelf life, on average.

A ballpoint tip that can write comfortably for a long period of time is not easy to produce, as it requires high-precision machinery and thin high-grade steel alloy plates. China, which as of 2017 produces about 80 percent of the world's ballpoint pens, relied on imported ballpoint tips and metal alloys before 2017.

== Standards ==
The International Organization for Standardization has published standards for ball point and roller ball pens:

ISO 12756
1998: Drawing and writing instruments – Ball point pens – Vocabulary
ISO 12757-1
1998: Ball point pens and refills – Part 1: General use
ISO 12757-2
1998: Ball point pens and refills – Part 2: Documentary use (DOC)
ISO 14145-1
1998: Roller ball pens and refills – Part 1: General use
ISO 14145-2
1998: Roller ball pens and refills – Part 2: Documentary use (DOC)

== Guinness World Records ==
- The world's largest functioning ballpoint pen was made by Acharya Makunuri Srinivasa in India. The pen measures 5.5 metres (18 ft 0.53 in) long and weighs 37.23 kilograms (82.08 lb).
- The world's most popular pen is the Bic Cristal, with the 100 billionth model sold in September, 2006. The Bic Cristal was launched in December 1950 and roughly 57 are sold per second.

== See also ==
- Rollerball pen
- Gel pen
- Retractable pen
- Ballpoint pen knife
- List of pen types, brands and companies
