= M&G Stationery =

Chinese stationery company

Shanghai M&G Stationery Inc.
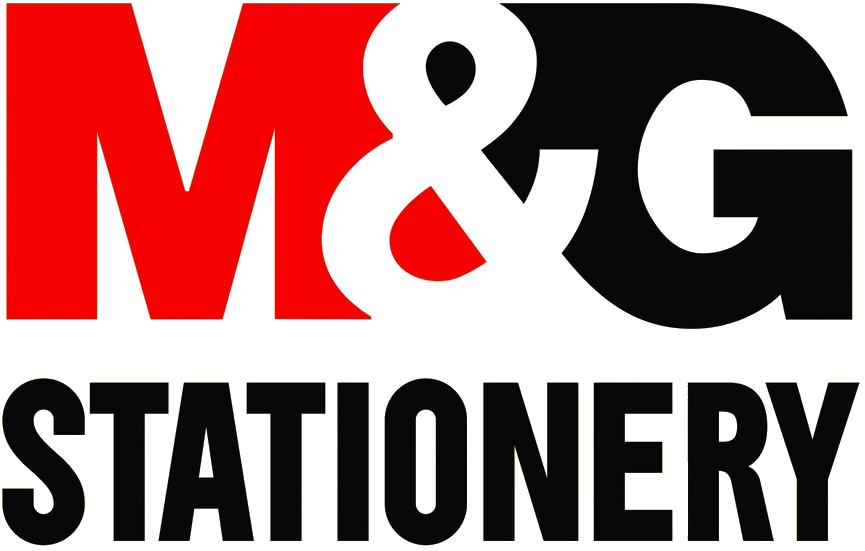

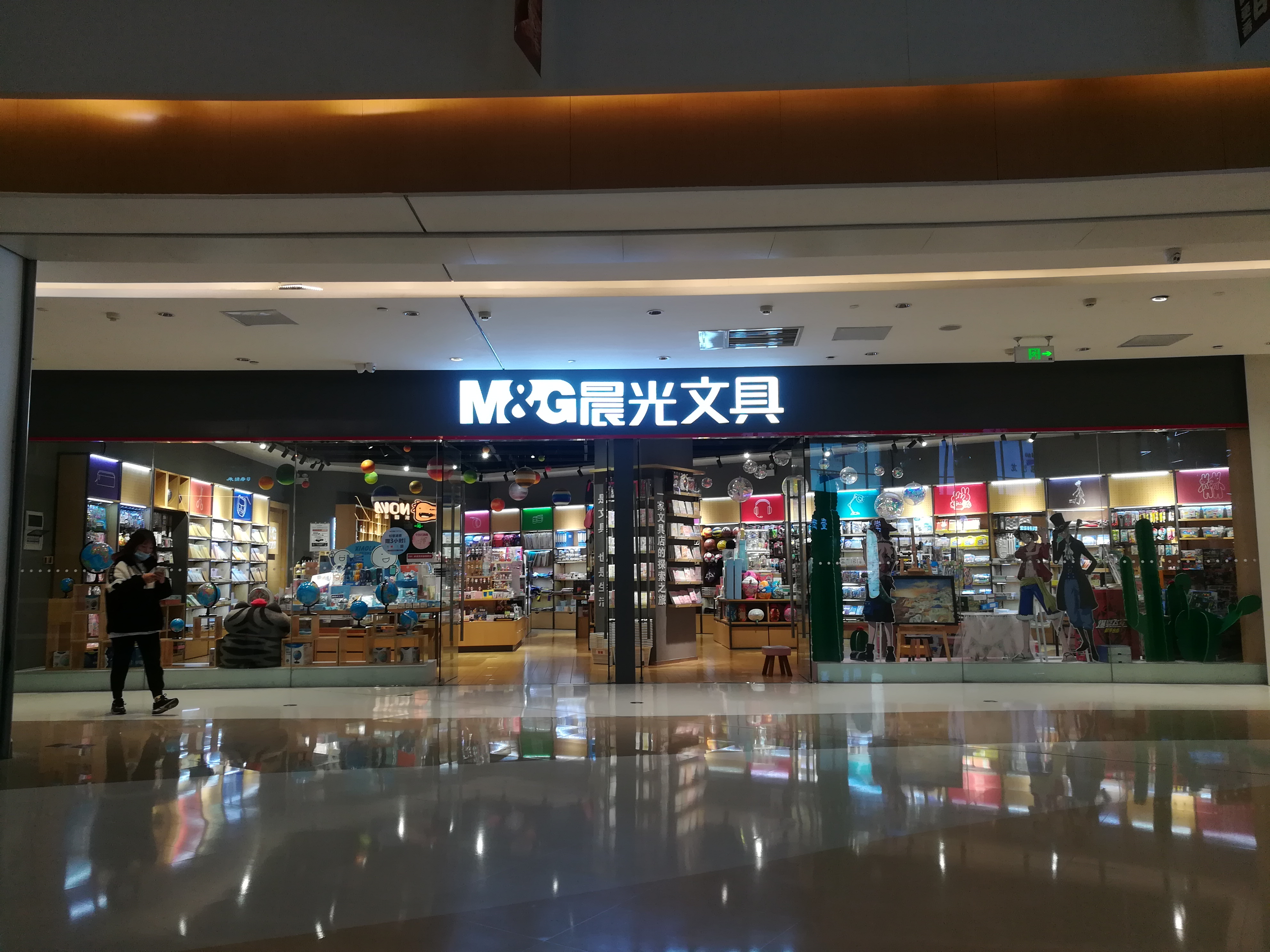
- M&G Stationery in Changsha, Hunan, China
- Native name: 晨光文具
- Formerly: Shanghai Sino-Korean M&G Stationery Manufacturing Co., Ltd
- Type: Public company
- Traded as: SSE: 603899
- Industry: Stationery
- Predecessor: Shanghai Sino-Korean M&G Stationery Manufacturing Co., Ltd.
- Founded: 1997; 29 years ago
- Founder: Chen Huxiong
- Headquarters: Songjiang District, Shanghai
- Key people: Chen Huwen (CEO)
- Products: (see below)
- Subsidiaries: M&G Stationery Pte Ltd. (Singapore)

Chinese name
- Chinese: 上海晨光文具股份有限公司
Transcriptions
Standard Mandarin
- Hanyu Pinyin: Shànghǎi Chénguāng Wénjù Yǒuxiàngōngsī

Shanghai Sino-Korean M&G Stationery Manufacturing Co., Ltd.
- Traditional Chinese: 上海中韓晨光文具製造有限公司
- Simplified Chinese: 上海中韩晨光文具制造有限公司
Transcriptions
Standard Mandarin
- Hanyu Pinyin: Shànghǎi Zhōng Hán Chénguāng Wénjù Yǒuxiàngōngsī
- Website: mgstationery.com

Shanghai M&G Stationery Inc., doing business as M&G Stationery (Chinese: 晨光文具; pinyin: Chénguāng Wénjù), is a manufacturing company of stationery products headquartered in Songjiang District, Shanghai, China. In 2023, M&G ranked 371st among "China's 500 Most Valuable Brands" by World Brand Lab.

== Overview ==
The company was established in 1997. It was originally known as "Shanghai Sino-Korean M&G Stationery Manufacturing Co., Ltd." (上海中韩晨光文具制造有限公司).

Its products include ballpoint pens, marker pens, erasers, glues, schoolbags, correction fluids, sticky notes, pencil leads, and pen refills. Its annual business volume is about 2 billion renminbi.

The company has a Singaporean subsidiary, "M&G Stationery Pte Ltd.".

== Products ==
M&G Stationery's range of products include:

Type	Products
Office	Staplers, pins, calculators, cutters, trash cans, clips, storage, file folders, white boards
Accessories	Erasers, glues, correction fluids, scissors, inks
Writing implements	Marker pens, ballpoint pens, gel pens
