= Milton Reynolds =

American businessman (1892–1976)

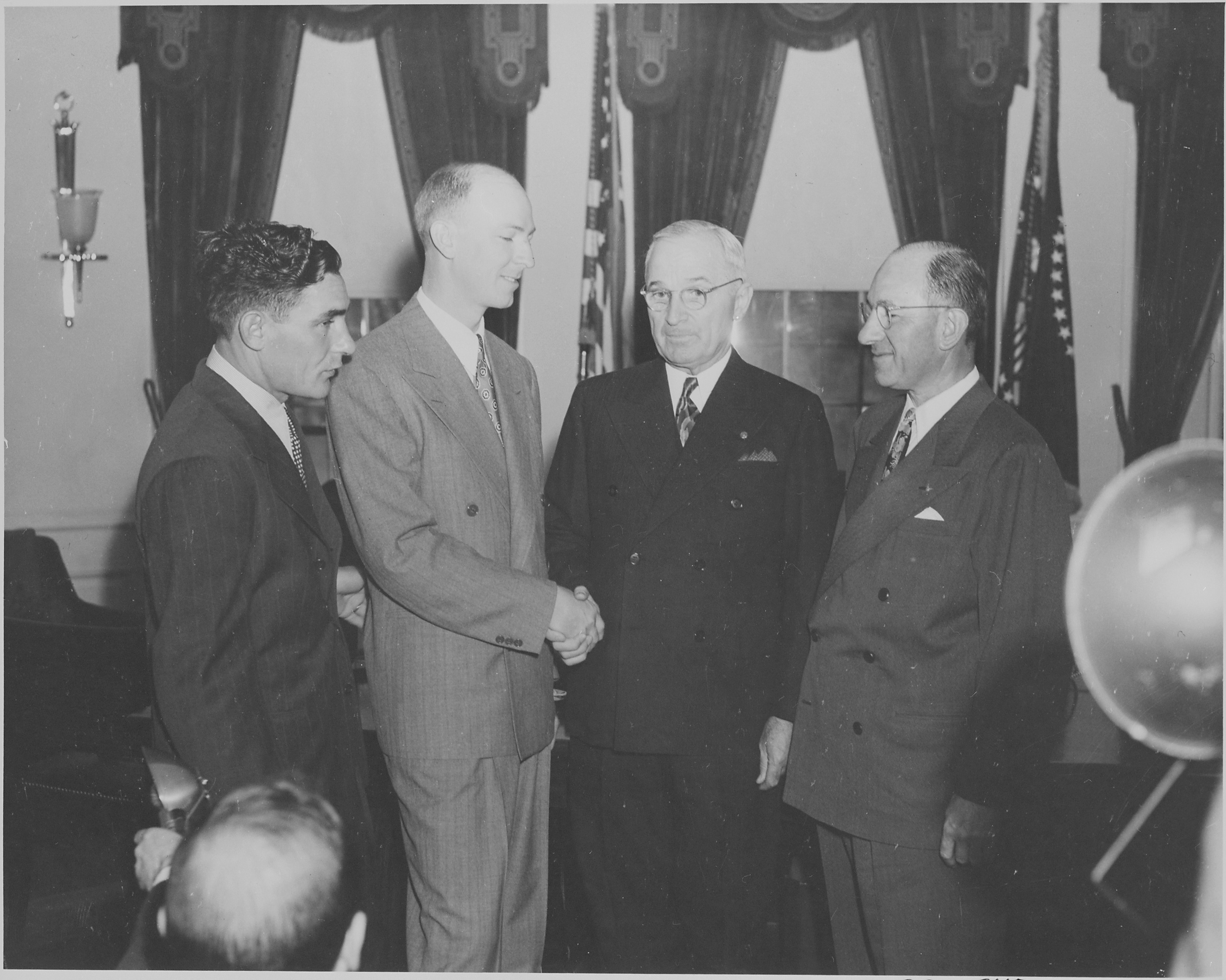
- Reynolds (right) in the Oval Office (1947)
- Born: Milton Reinsberg; 1892; Albert Lea, Minnesota, U.S.
- Died: 1976 (aged 83–84)
- Occupation: Entrepreneur
- Known for: Introducing of the first ballpoint pen to the U.S. market

Milton Reynolds (1892–1976), an American entrepreneur, was born Milton Reinsberg in Albert Lea, Minnesota. He is most famously known for the manufacture and introduction of the first ballpoint pen to be sold in the U.S. market in October 1945. He was also inventor of the “talking sign” promotional placard for retail stores, sponsor and crewman on the twin-engine propeller flight that broke Howard Hughes' round-the-world record, and among the first investors in Syntex, which pioneered the combined oral contraceptive pill, or birth-control pill.

Reynolds’ business fortunes and personal wealth rose and fell numerous times during his career. He changed his name because he believed that his customers, including major U.S. retailers, were reluctant to buy from Jews. He had previously tried several ventures that made and lost considerable sums, including trying to corner the market on used automobile tires and investing in prefabricated houses. A business he built around retail sign making equipment, Reynolds Printasign, was owned and operated by two generations of his heirs.

== Ballpoint pen ==
=== Developing the gravity-feed ballpoint ===
A rolling-ball mechanism for marking leather was conceived as early as 1888 by American inventor John Loud. In 1938, newspaper editor László Bíró, a Hungarian-émigré to Argentina, and business partner Henry G. Martin patented a device for marking printers' galleys. The Biro pen used gelatinous ink combined with capillary action to draw the ink out as it was deposited on paper by the rolling-ball tip. Because the pen did not leak at high altitude, the Biro venture sold a quantity of pens to the Royal Air Force for keeping flight logs, under a contract with Miles Aircraft. Subsequently, Biro's company Eterpen, S.A. licensed manufacturing rights in the US to a joint venture between Eversharp and Eberhard Faber.

While paying a sales call to Goldblatt's department store in Chicago, Reynolds was shown one of the Biro pens and recognized it as a potentially hot consumer item for the postwar era. Working with engineer William Huernergardt and machinist Titus Haffa, Reynolds came up with a design that did not rely on patented capillary action but caused ink to flow by gravity. However, successful gravity feed required much thinner, viscous ink and a much larger barrel to avoid constant refilling. The thin ink made the pens prone to leakage, but, realizing time was of the essence, Reynolds rushed them to market anyway, touting the high ink capacity. With roller balls repurposed from the metal beads used in war-surplus bomb sights and barrels machined from aircraft aluminum, the Reynolds pens had another feature that captured the popular imagination: In early ads, Reynolds claimed, “It writes under water!” The claim was essentially truthful because his pen wrote successfully on wet paper. Consumers had little use for this bizarre practical application, but a generation of shoppers remembered the slogan long after Reynolds passed into history.

=== Introduction to the market ===
Although Eversharp had plans to introduce a pen modeled after Biro's, Reynolds introduced his pen first. Before and during the war, when he sold sign making equipment to retailers, Reynolds had cultivated personal relationships with the heads of all the department stores. Among these was Fred Gimbel, whose family owned Gimbels in Manhattan, the arch-rival of Macy's. Through an exclusive deal with Gimbel, the Reynolds pen debuted at the 32nd Street store on the morning of October 29, 1945. World War II had just ended (V-J Day was on August 14), so public exuberance was high. The pen sold for $12.50 (equivalent to $224 in 2025). The day the pen went on sale, an estimated 5,000 shoppers stormed Gimbels, and approximately 50 NYPD officers had to be dispatched for crowd control.

=== Reynolds International Pen Company ===
The Chicago-based Reynolds International Pen Company made 8 million pens in six weeks, cranking out lathe-turned pens in a manufacturing facility converted from an indoor tennis court. Thereafter came an era chronicled in the print media of the time as the “Pen Wars,” as latecomer Eversharp finally entered the market. Eversharp then sued Reynolds for patent infringement, and Reynolds countersued on the grounds of illegal restraint of trade. Ultimately, the main result of the legal battle was to generate reams of free publicity for both products. Reynolds capitalized on his sudden success by introducing a new model dubbed the “Reynolds Rocket” from the Reynolds International Pen Company. He shipped pens overseas while making partnership overtures, even buying a French estate, le Château du Mesnil-Saint-Denis in 1947, as an intended base of European operations.

=== Pen wars ===
The established pen manufacturers Eversharp, Parker Pen Company, and Waterman pens were expected to compete and flood the market with much cheaper models backed up with big national advertising campaigns. Rather than compete and watch his margins dwindle, Reynolds sold the company off in pieces. European rights to the name went to a French concern, and the Reynolds pen became a well-known French brand (although the company is just as well known for its inexpensive fountain pens, which schoolchildren use for lessons in cursive penmanship). However, in Britain especially, “Biro” had become the generic term for any ballpoint pen. Many of the parts for the Reynolds Rocket were made by Fisher-Armour Mfg in Chicago. When Reynolds decided to stop selling, Paul C. Fisher, later to found Fisher Pen Company and invent the Fisher Space Pen, decided to try to improve the pen. Reynolds sold the corporate charter to the U.S. government, which renamed it the Reynolds Construction Company and allegedly passed clandestine payments to foreign governments through the paper entity.

== Aviation ==
Reynolds took his profits and indulged his hobby, a lifelong love of flying. In the 1930s, he owned a Stinson Reliant monoplane he named the "Flying Printasign" after his signmaking company. Even as he was planning to exit the pen business, he bought a used Douglas A-26 Invader bomber. He had the armor removed and retrofitted the plane with commercial engines, christening it the Reynolds Bombshell. He hired war-hero Bill Odom as pilot and Tex Sallee as copilot. From 12-16 April 1947, the three of them flew around the world in 78 hours, 55.5 minutes, making nine stops for refueling, to set the world record for twin-engine propeller aircraft. (The previous record, set by Howard Hughes, was 91 hours, 14 minutes. Both records were surpassed in 1957.) Reynolds had timed the flight to coincide with the international introduction of the Reynolds Rocket, a pen that wrote in two colors.

Reynolds and crew made one more newsworthy intercontinental flight, an expedition to the Amne Machin mountain range in Tibet and K2, the second highest mountain in the world, between China and Pakistan. He renamed his retrofitted bomber the "China Explorer." He believed (wrongly) that K2 was taller than Mount Everest in the Himalayas and hoped to leverage the publicity he'd get from establishing that fact.

The Chinese government detained the flight near Nanking and then sent fighter planes to escort it across the Sea of Japan. In the intervening period, Reynolds and the China Explorer had diverted their guards, taken off from Lunghwa Field, and completed a quick flyover of K2. Reynolds family lore has it that Reynolds had made a secret deal from the outset with the US government to look for evidence of Chinese nuclear tests. No one involved with the expedition admitted knowledge of such a plan. For many years thereafter, the clandestine payments passed through the Reynolds Construction Company by US intelligence were part of an operation code-named "KK Mountain".

Reynolds sold the Reynolds Bombshell in 1948. After passing through several owners, it ended up in Iran, used by Bell Helicopter as a transport. It was abandoned there at the time of the Iran Revolution of 1979 and remains on display there in the Aerospace Exhibition Centre, in Tehran.

== Retirement ==
Reynolds Printasign was bought out by his son James, and subsequently run by his grandson Thomas. Milton Reynolds retired to a hacienda near Mexico City, called the "Milton Hilton." Reynolds and investor Charles Allen speculated in land and invested in Iranian oil, and Reynolds traveled the world on commercial flights as an unofficial "goodwill ambassador" for the United States.

In 1944, he authored a book entitled "Hasta La Vista", which was a story of his travels in South America. In 1944 the first edition was printed by the Greenville Publishers. An alternate "special" first edition (signed and issued only for his special friends) of the same book was printed in Mexico by the Chicago Packet Company and is highly prized by collectors.

== Personal life ==
Reynolds was married to his first wife, Edna Loebe, until her death in 1952. The couple had two children, a son and a daughter.

In the early 2000s through his death in 2012, table tennis champion Marty Reisman managed Edna's great-niece, Cynthia Loebe, for a planned theatrical touring act. Loebe did not play professionally; the persona was created for exhibition matches and documentaries. This modern-day association between the Loebe family and Reisman provided biographical inspiration for the fictional narrative of pen tycoon character Milton Rockwell in the 2025 film Marty Supreme, despite Loebe having no involvement with the production.

== In popular culture ==
The 2025 film Marty Supreme features a fictionalized version of Reynolds named Milton Rockwell (the CEO of Rockwell Ink), portrayed by Kevin O'Leary. The film's narrative bridge between the ballpoint pen industry and the table tennis scene was inspired by the real-life association between Cynthia Loebe and Marty Reisman during the 2000s, though Loebe was not involved with the film.
