= John J. Loud =

American lawyer and inventor (1844–1916)

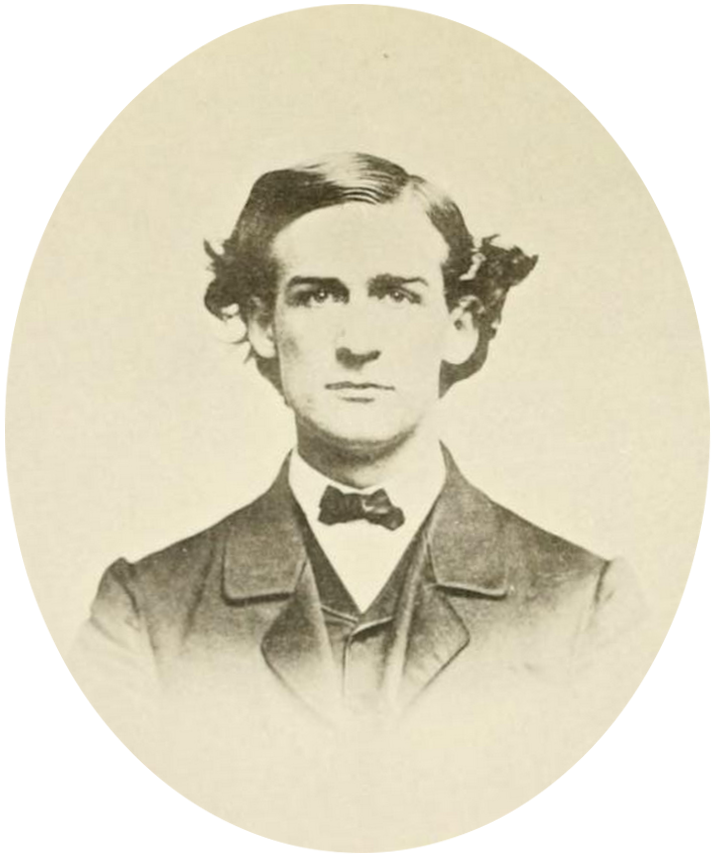
- Loud at Harvard College, c. 1866
- Born: John Jacob Loud; November 2, 1844; Weymouth, Massachusetts, U.S.
- Died: August 10, 1916 (aged 71); Weymouth, Massachusetts, U.S.
- Education: Harvard University
- Occupations: Lawyer; inventor
- Known for: Ballpoint pen
- Spouse: Emily Keith Vickery (m. 1872; died 1911)
- Children: 8

John Jacob Loud (November 2, 1844 – August 10, 1916) was an American lawyer and inventor best known for inventing the ballpoint pen.

Trained as a lawyer at Harvard College, Loud worked at the Union National Bank in Weymouth, Massachusetts, as a cashier. He was also active in his community as a member of his church, a trustee of many local organizations, and a member of local historical societies.

Loud invented and obtained a patent for what is considered to be the first ballpoint pen in 1888. However, his invention was not commercialized, and the patent would eventually lapse. The modern ballpoint pen would be patented later in 1938 by László Bíró, 22 years after Loud's death.

== Early life and education ==
John Jacob Loud was born in Weymouth, Massachusetts, on November 2, 1844, the only son of John White Loud and Sarah Humphrey Blanchard. One of his sisters, Annie Frances Loud, was a locally noted composer of sacred music. He was a descendant of Francis Loud, originally of Ipswich, Massachusetts, and Mayflower passengers William Brewster and John Alden.

He attended school in Weymouth, graduating from Weymouth High School, and later attended Harvard College, graduating with a law degree in 1866.

== Career ==
Loud was admitted to the Suffolk County Bar on February 2, 1872. He furthered his studies and training in law while working at the firm Jewell, Gaston & Field. However, he opted to join his father in the banking profession. In 1871, he joined his father in working for the Union National Bank as an assistant cashier. Upon his father's death in 1874, Loud assumed his position as a cashier and remained in that post until his resignation in 1895 for health reasons.

== Inventions ==
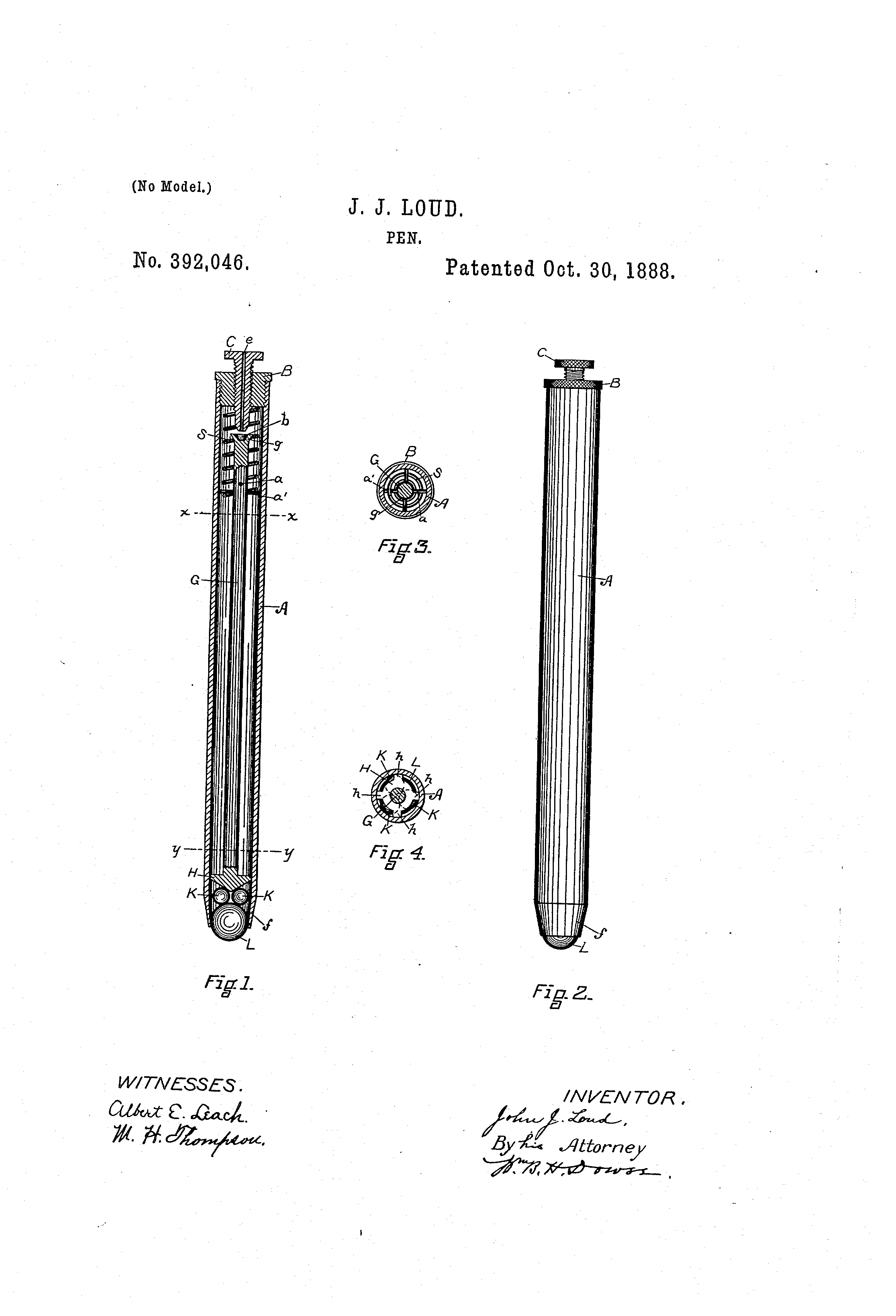
Loud's patent of the ballpoint pen (1888)

Loud was keenly interested in inventing. On October 30, 1888, he obtained the first patent for a ballpoint pen. (Note: Though contemporary sources state he may have been a leather tanner at the time, biographical accounts do not support this.) He had set out to make a writing instrument able to write on leather products, which then-common fountain pens could not. Loud's pen had a small rotating steel ball, held in place by a socket. In the patent, he noted:

My invention consists of an improved reservoir or fountain pen, especially useful, among other purposes, for marking on rough surfaces such as wood, coarse wrapping paper, and other articles where an ordinary pen could not be used.

Although his invention could be used to mark rough surfaces such as leather, as he had originally intended, it proved to be too coarse for letter-writing. With no commercial viability, its potential went unexploited and the patent eventually lapsed.

Loud had also registered patents for a "toy cannon" and a firecracker cannon in 1887 and 1888, respectively.

== Personal life and death ==
John Loud was married to Emily Keith Vickery from November 7, 1872, until her death in November 1911. The couple had eight children.

Residing in Weymouth, Loud was a member of the Union Congregational Church. He was an ardent genealogist and an active member of the Maine Genealogical Society, New Hampshire Genealogical Society, New England Historic Genealogical Society, and Weymouth Historical Society (of which he was a founding member). Loud was a trustee of the Weymouth Savings Banks, Tufts Library, and the Derby Academy, and a conductor of the Union Religious Society choir at Weymouth and in Braintree.

A noted orator, he spoke at many local events, including delivering an address upon the building of the first warship at the Fore River Shipyard in 1900. He also wrote poetry and songs in his spare time.

He died at his home in Weymouth on August 10, 1916, and was buried at Village Cemetery in Weymouth.
