= International Ink Library =

Forensic database of inks

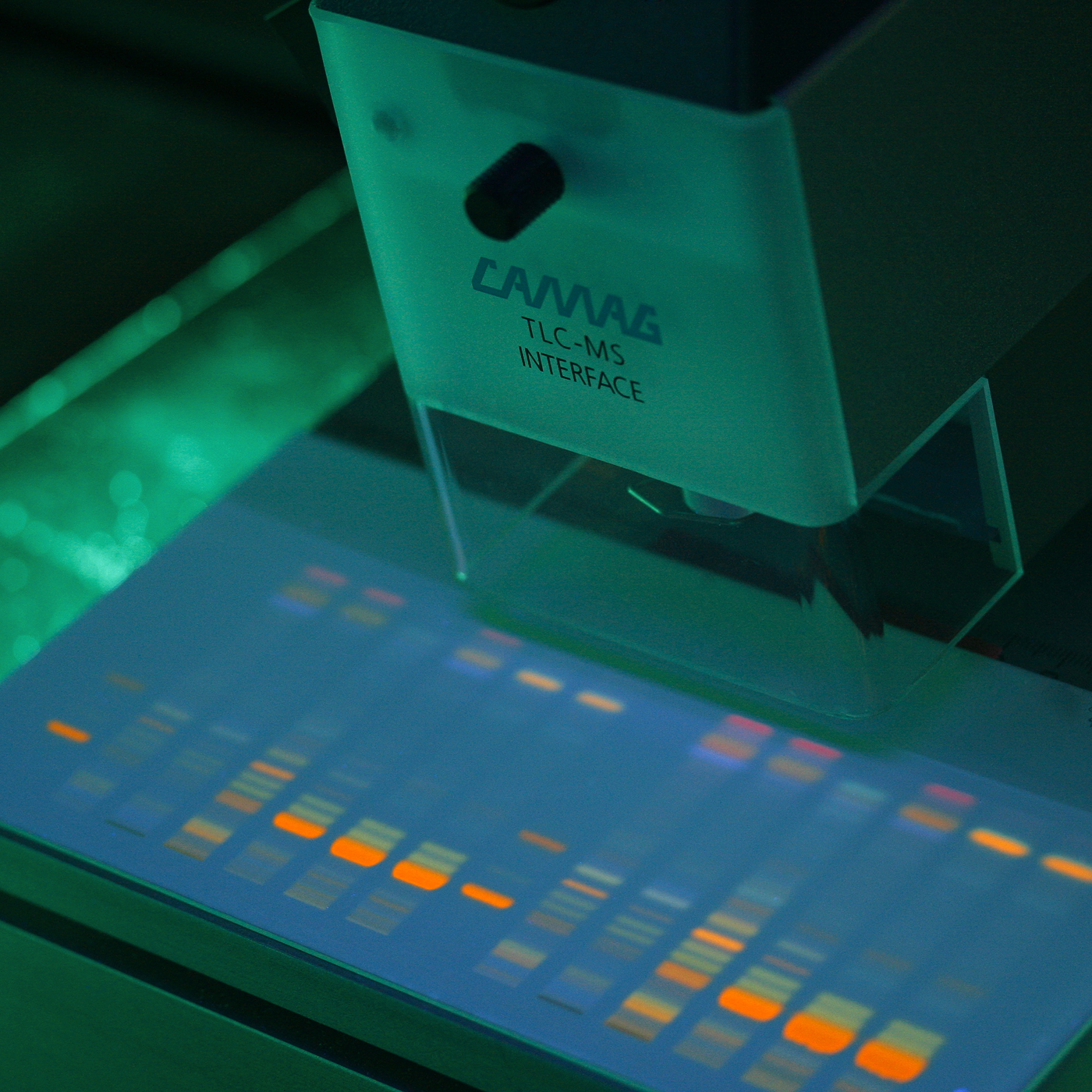
Thin layer chromatography

The International Ink Library and its Digital Ink Library are an FBI forensic database of inks. It is used to identify writing instruments, makes, models, ink types, and document authenticity. It contains over 15,000 samples of pen, marker, and printer inks dating from the 1920s. As part of the FBI Questioned Documents Branch, it is used to investigate criminal and terrorist cases, fraudulent documents, forgeries, checks, money orders, and threats to persons. It uses high-performance thin-layer chromatography, electrophoresis, ultraviolet spectra, electrospray ionization and mass spectrometry. It also analyzes chemical date tags expressly inserted by ink manufacturers. The database originated in the 1960s from the collection of Antonio Cantu, former Chief Forensic Chemist at the Secret Service, which dedicated the lab in his honor.

There is no cost to access, but is limited to U.S. Secret Service directorates, students through coordinated research initiatives, and law enforcement entities. It handles over 500 cases per year. It has been used in such cases as the Jasper Johns forged documents, the Martha Stewart conviction, as well as the 9/11 attacks.

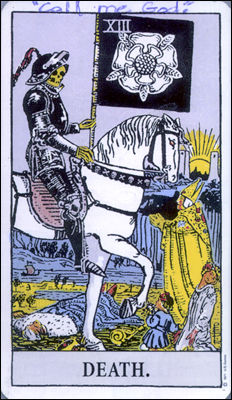
Ink sampled from D.C. sniper case
