= Deli (company) =

Chinese stationery company

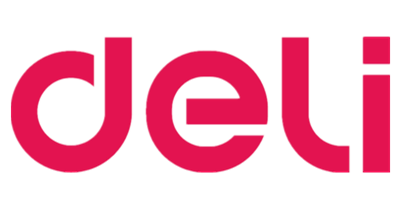
- Type: Private
- Industry: Stationery
- Founded: 1981; 45 years ago
- Founder: Fujun Lou
- Headquarters: Ningbo, China
- Area served: Worldwide
- Products: School and office supplies, tools, printers
- Revenue: ▲US$6 billion (2022)
- Number of employees: 16,000 (2022)
- Website: deliworld.com

Deli Group (simplified Chinese: 得力集团; traditional Chinese: 得力集團), fully referred to as Deli Group Co., Ltd., commonly known as Deli, is a Chinese stationery maker founded by Fujun Lou in 1981. The company focuses on the fields of office and school supplies. It owns several sub-brands, including Deli Tools, Deli Plus, Deli Genius, Agnite, Nusign, and Dmast. In October 2018 it was the largest stationery manufacturer in Asia.

In addition to stationery products, Deli manufactures office equipment, sporting goods, and tools. Headquartered in Ningbo, it also established operations in overseas markets, such as India, Indonesia, and Malaysia. The company has product design centers in Shanghai, Seoul, and Tokyo.

In February 2019, Deli became a supplier to the United Nations Population Fund. In September 2024, it broke ground for its new stationery factory in Vietnam, with a total investment of $270 million.

In 2021, Deli made the China's Top 500 Private Enterprises List. It was included in the List again in 2023 and 2024.

== History ==
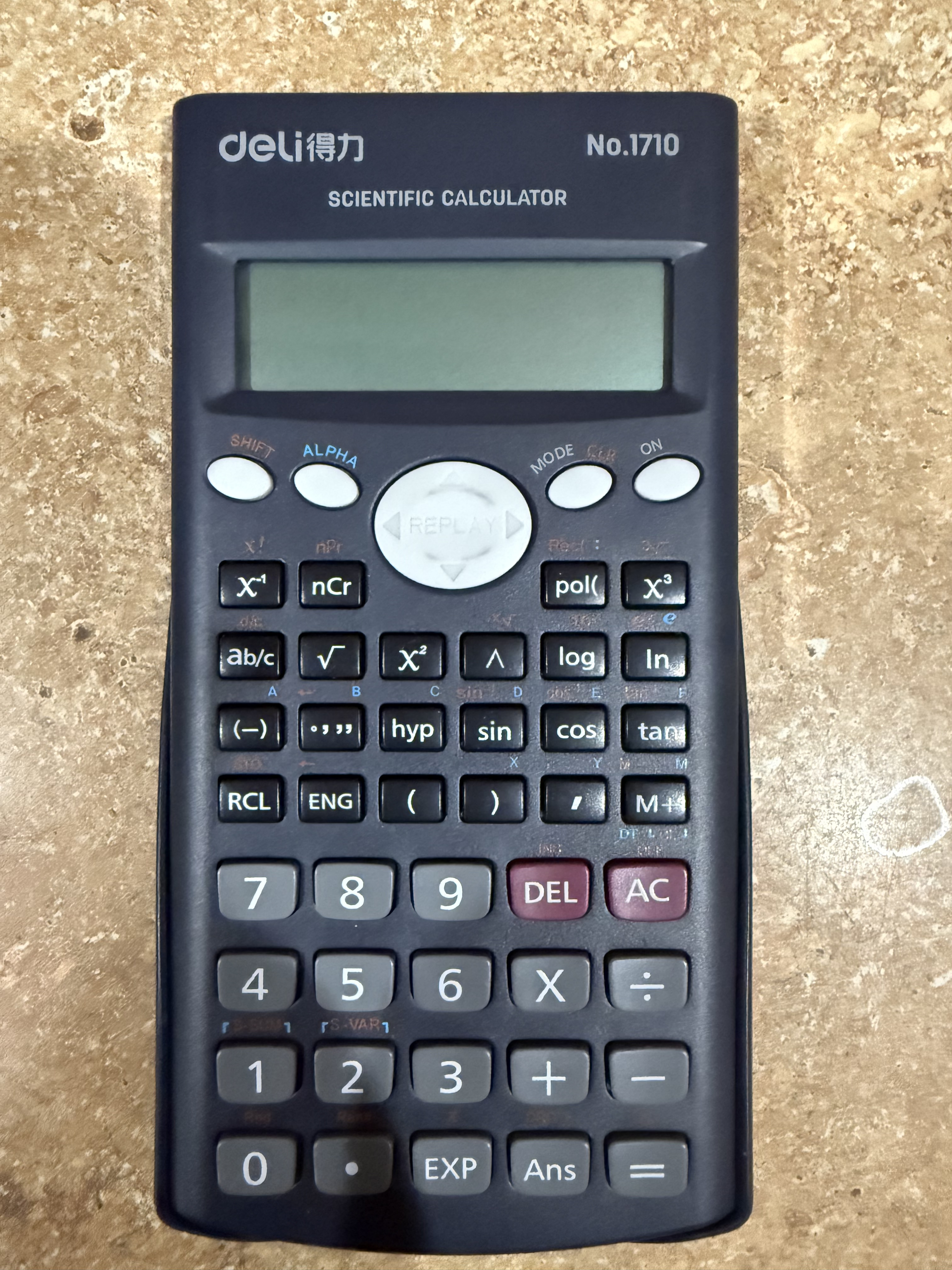
A scientific calculator manufactured by Deli.

Deli Group was established in 1981, and in 1997 was officially launched as Ningbo Deli Group Corporation Ltd., by Fujun Lou. It began as a stationery supplier company local to China. In 1998, it entered the overseas market.

In 2011, Deli signed a strategic cooperation with e-commerce company Jingdong. The company forayed into the printer industry in 2015.

By 2017, the sales of the company reached 10 billion yuan.

Deli Group established its overseas production base in Vietnam in 2018. At this time the Group also formed the Deli Vietnam Company Limited company, which is based in Bac Ninh. In addition to stationery the company produces glue, whiteboards, electronic calculators, and other school supplies.

On September 28, 2024, Deli Group held a groundbreaking ceremony for its Hai Duong factory in Vietnam. The Hai Duong factory has a total investment of $270 million, and is expected to begin production 2026.

== Sub-brand ==
As of March 2025, Deli Group has ten sub-brands. They are:

- Damast, a painting products company and joint brand between Deli and Pebeo
- Deli Office, a bulk office stationery supplier
- Deli School, a school-focused stationery brand
- Nusign, a stationery company marketed towards "higher end" customer bases
- Agnite, a sporting goods company
- Deli Plus, an office furniture company
- Deli Tool, a power tools company
- JISHI, a group-buying platform for companies and government
- Deli Genius, a brand of educational tools.
