= Monami =

South Korean office supplies manufacturer

nami Co., Ltd
- Type: Public
- Founded: 1960
- Founder: Song Samseok
- Headquarters: Yong-In Si, South Korea
- Key people: Song Ha gyoung, CEO
- Products: Office supplies
- Subsidiaries: 4
- Website: monami.com

Monami Co., Ltd (KRX: 005360) is a Korean maker of stationery, printer supplies, office supplies, pens and other writing instruments as well as artist materials. Founded in 1960, it continues to hold considerable market share in its home market, South Korea. The name of the company, sometimes written as MonAmi, derives from "Mon ami" ("My friend" in French) and alludes to the philosophy of the company to serve its clients as a friend. Recently Monami has made many limited editions. Some of the edition motivated by the Korean poem.

== Monami 153 ==
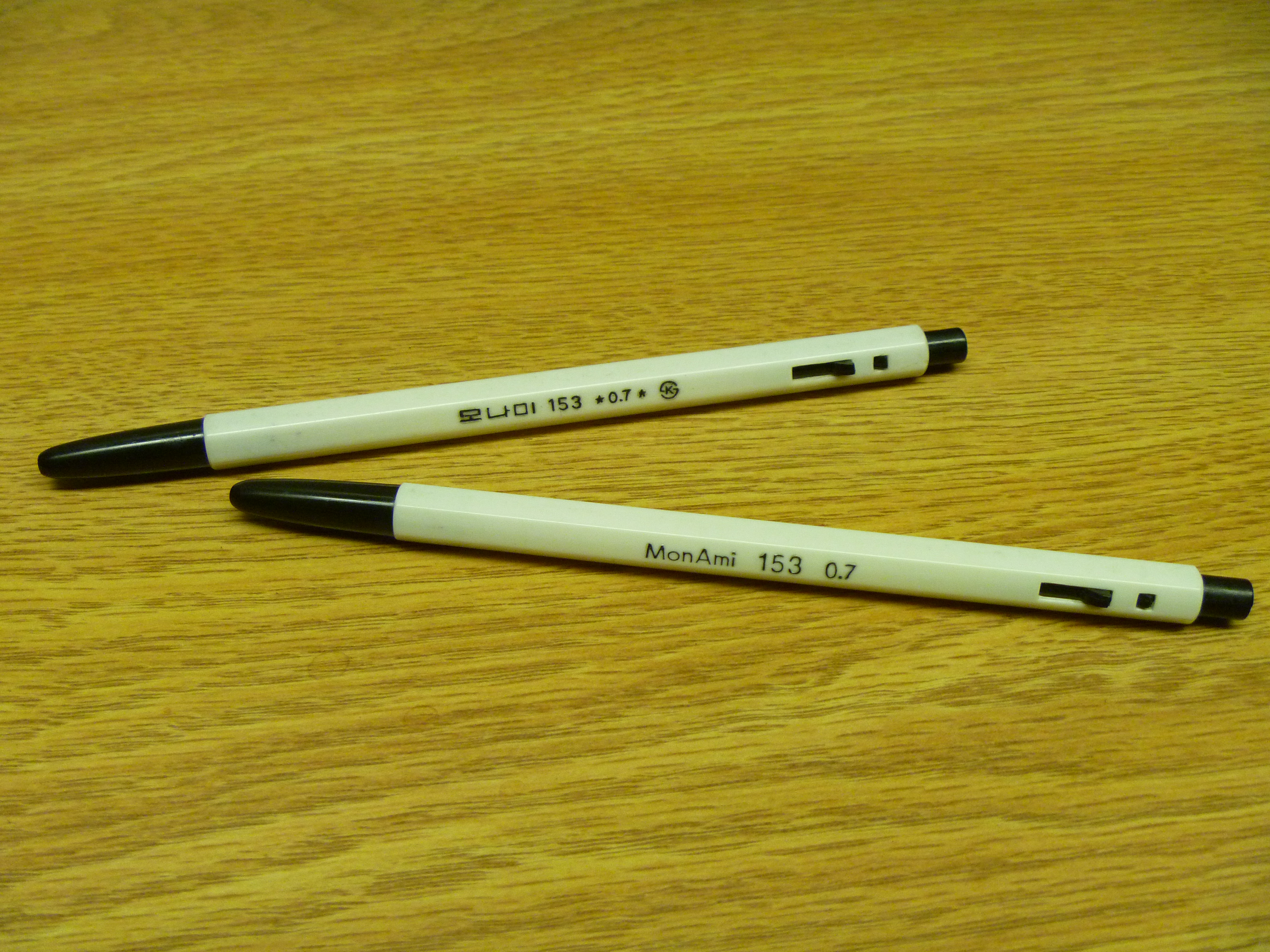
Two Monami 153 pens

A symbol of daily post-war life in Korea, Monami's basic pen has continuously been on sale since its inception in 1963 and is recognizable by nearly everyone in Korea. In 2009 this pen was noted by the government-run Korea Design Foundation as a design that has significantly influenced daily life in Korea. 3.3 billion have been sold, and the figures are still rising.

The pen's designation can be explained by the fact that the 153 was only the third product the company produced and that it originally sold for 15 won, the price of a newspaper or a bus ride at the time.

While the quality and price of this remarkable pen have risen, the design remains unchanged.

The gold-plated version of Monami 153 is also available.

== Production bases and facilities ==
Monami has factories at Ansan, South Korea, and Rayong, Thailand.
