= Rollerball pen =

Ballpoint pen with less viscous ink

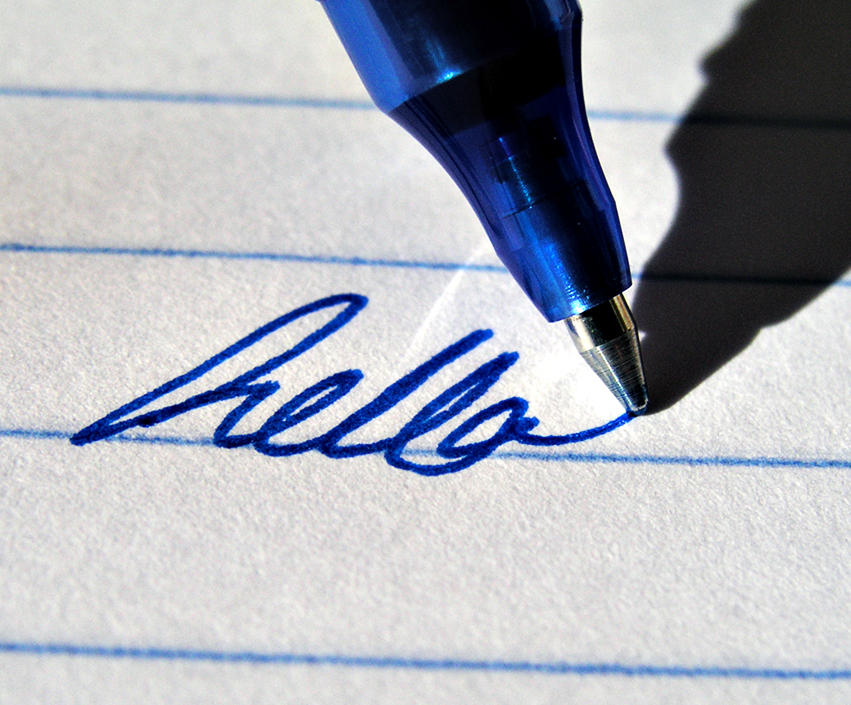
A gel-based rollerball pen

Roller ball pens or roll pens are pens which use ball-point writing mechanisms with water-based liquid or gelled ink, as opposed to the oil-based viscous inks found in ballpoint pens. These less viscous inks, which tend to saturate more deeply and more widely into paper than other types of ink, give roller ball pens their distinctive writing qualities. The writing point is a tiny ball, usually 0.5 or 0.7 mm in diameter, that transfers the ink from the reservoir onto the paper as the pen moves.

== Advantages ==
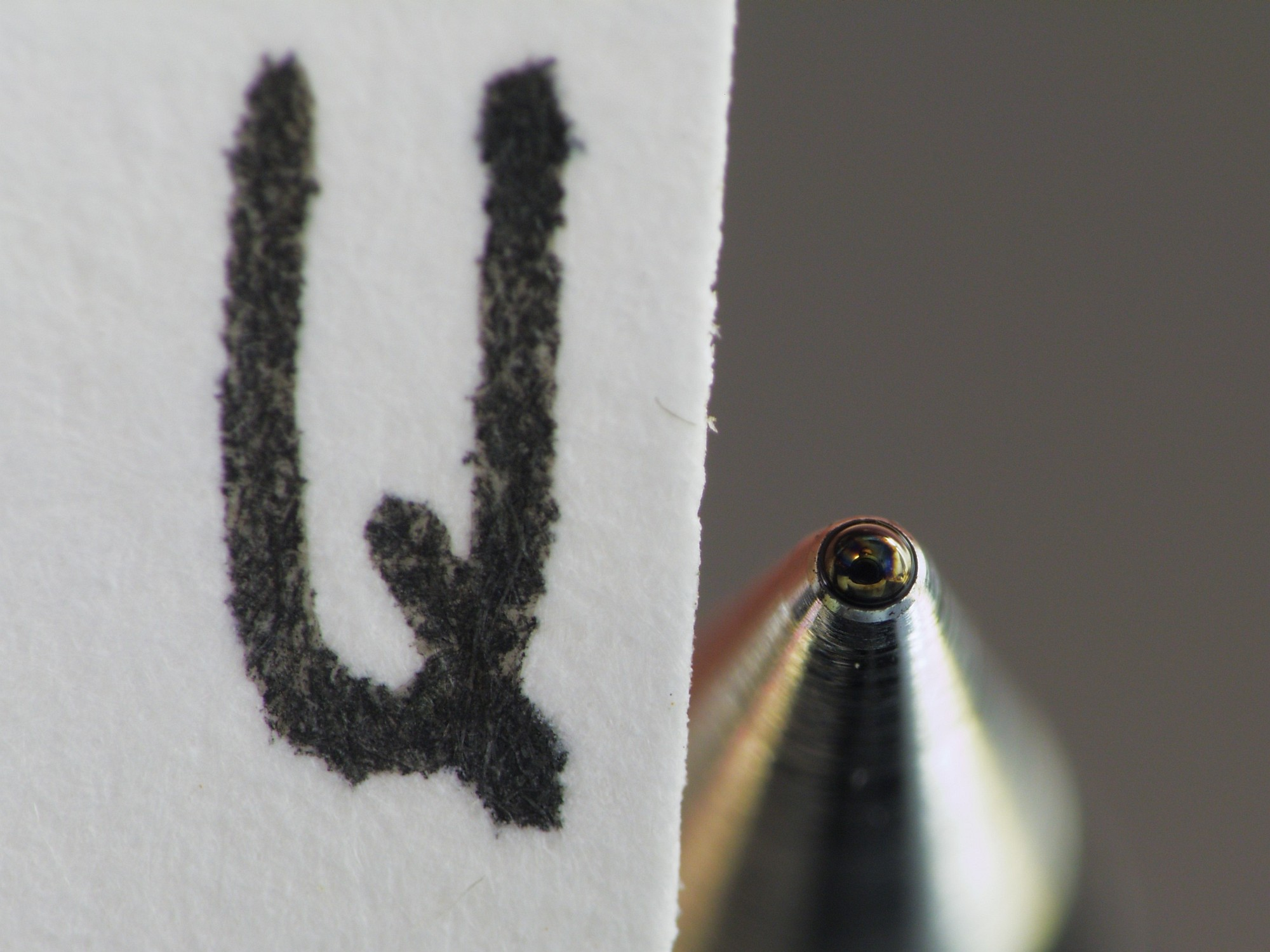
Close up of an extra fine roller ball pen next to something written with it

There are two main types of roller ball pens: liquid-ink pens and gel-ink pens. The "liquid-ink" type uses an ink and ink-supply system similar to a fountain pen, and they are designed to combine the convenience of a ballpoint pen with the smooth "wet ink" effect of a fountain pen. The "liquid-ink" type rollerball pens were introduced in 1963 by the Japanese company Ohto. The gel-ink type rollerball pens were patented in 1982 by Sakura Color Products.

Gel inks usually contain pigments, while liquid inks are limited to dyestuffs, as pigments will sink down in liquid ink (sedimentation). The thickness and suspending power of gels allows the use of pigments in gelled ink, which yields a greater variety of brighter colors than is possible in liquid ink. Gels also allow for the use of heavier pigments with metallic or glitter effects, or opaque pastel pigments that can be seen on dark surfaces.

Liquid ink roller ball pens flow extremely consistently and skip less than gel ink pens do. The lower viscosity of liquid ink increases the likelihood of consistent inking of the ball, whereas the higher viscosity of gel ink produces "skipping", that is, occasional gaps in lines or letters.

In comparison to ballpoint pens,

- Rollerball pens have a unique ink flow system for an even, high-performance writing experience.
- Less pressure needs to be applied to the pen to have it write cleanly. This permits holding the pen with less stress on the hand, saving energy and improving comfort. This can also translate to quicker writing speeds. This is especially true of liquid ink pens.
- The inks usually have a greater range of colors due to the wider choice of suitable water-soluble dyes and/or to the use of pigments.
- They tend to write more clearly than ballpoint pens do.

== Disadvantages ==
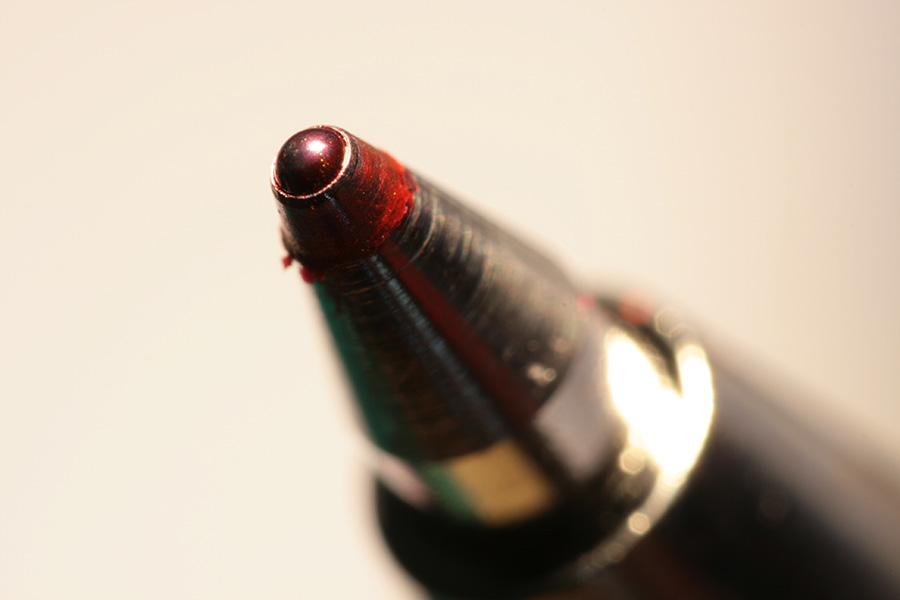
Close-up shot of a rollerball pen tip

There are a number of disadvantages inherent to roller ball pens:

- Roller ball pens with liquid-ink are more likely to "bleed" through the paper. Liquid ink is more readily absorbed into the paper due to its lower viscosity. This viscosity also causes problems when leaving the tip on the paper. The bleed-through effect is greatly increased as the ink is continually absorbed into the paper, creating a blotch. This does not affect gel-ink roller ball pens as much. This is one way through which the thickness of gel-ink gives it an advantage, in that it isn't as prone to being absorbed. Though the bleed-through effect of a gel-ink roller ball is greater than that of a ballpoint, it is usually not too significant.
- Roller ball pens generally run out of ink more quickly than ballpoints because roller balls use a greater amount of ink while writing. This is especially true of liquid-ink roller balls, due to gel ink having a low absorption rate as a result of its thickness. Neither lasts as long as a ballpoint.
- Uncapped roller ball pens are more likely to leak ink when, for example, placed into a shirt pocket, but most pens include caps or other mechanisms to prevent this from happening.
- A roller ball tip is more likely to clog and jam when writing over correction fluid that has not yet completely dried. This often renders the ink cartridge useless.

== Standards ==
The International Organization for Standardization has published standards for roller ball pens:

ISO 14145-1
1998: Roller ball pens and refills – Part 1: General use
ISO 14145-2
1998: Roller ball pens and refills – Part 2: Documentary use (DOC)

To comply to the ISO 14145-2:1998 documentary use standard the following has to be established by an ISO/IEC 17025 accredited laboratory:

- Erasure resistance – The surface of the testing paper shall show clear evidence of damage before the line is rendered invisible when tested.
- Ethanol resistance – The line shall remain visible when tested with a 50% aqueous ethanol solution (volume fraction).
- Hydrochloric acid resistance – The line shall remain visible when tested with a 10% aqueous hydrochloric acid solution (mass fraction).
- Ammonium hydroxide resistance – The line shall remain visible when tested with a 10% aqueous ammonium hydroxide acid solution (mass fraction).
- Bleaching resistance – The line shall remain visible when tested with an aqueous 3% freshly made solution of chloramine-T (mass fraction).
- Water resistance – The line shall remain visible when tested with water.
- Light resistance – The line shall remain visible when tested with light.

Most roller ball refills comply to the ISO 14145-2:1998 standard and are approved for documentary use.

== Uses ==
Former MI-6 agent Richard Tomlinson alleges that Pentel Rolling Writer roller ball pens were extensively used by SIS agents to produce secret writing (invisible messages) while on missions.

The Ohto Model CB-10F Ceramic Roller Ball Pen was used at the 1990 Economic Summit of Industrialized Nations.

== See also ==
- Ballpoint pen
- Gel pen
