= Gel pen =

Special pen made with a water-based gel which makes handwriting appear glossy

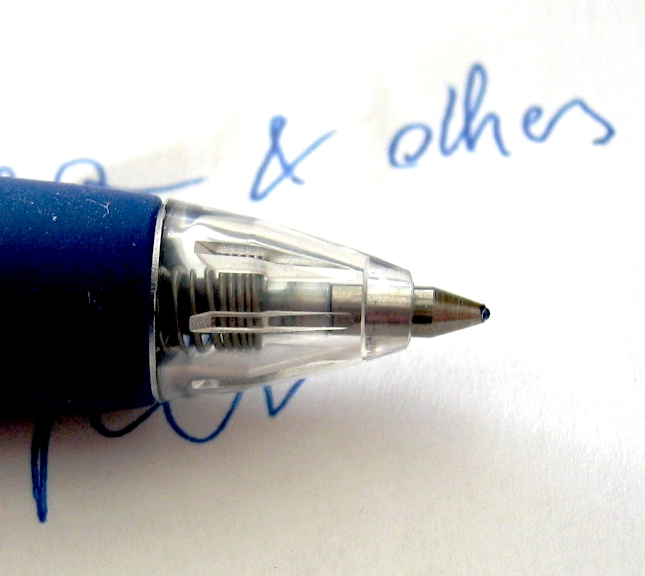
- Gel pen cylindric tip detail
- Type: Pen
- Inventor: Sakura Corp.
- Inception: 1984; 42 years ago
- Manufacturer: Sakura, Pilot, Uni-ball, Paper Mate, Pentel, Zebra
- Available: Yes

A gel pen uses ink in which pigment is suspended in a water-based gel. Because the ink is thick and opaque, it shows up more clearly on slick surfaces than the typical inks used in ballpoint or felt tip pens. Gel pens can be used for many types of writing and illustration.

The general design of a gel pen is similar to that of a regular ink-based pen, with a barrel containing the writing mechanism and a cap, and a reservoir filled with ink. At the end of the ink tube is an ink "follower", made of more viscous gelled material which is usually translucent and follows the water-based ink. The follower mainly prevents leakage and back flow of the ink.

The barrels can be created in many different sizes and designs; some have finger grips of rubber or plastic. The size of the nib or pen tip ranges from 0.18 millimetres (0.0071 in) to 1.5 millimetres (0.059 in).

== History ==
The first gel pens were produced by Sakura Color Products Corporation of Osaka, Japan. The first gel pen to be released commercially was the Ball sign 280 in 1984 which was sold by Sakura Color Products in Japan. Their first product which became available in America in the late 1980s was the Gelly Roll. Following this, Crayola began producing pens with thicker bodies, marketing them to children. The gels of these pens were made up of metallic sparkles and fluorescent colors, popular among artists for their easy control and smooth drawing capability.

Door County Sheriff's Office has advised the public to write checks with gel pens which is harder to remove than a regular ink pen.

== Gel inks ==
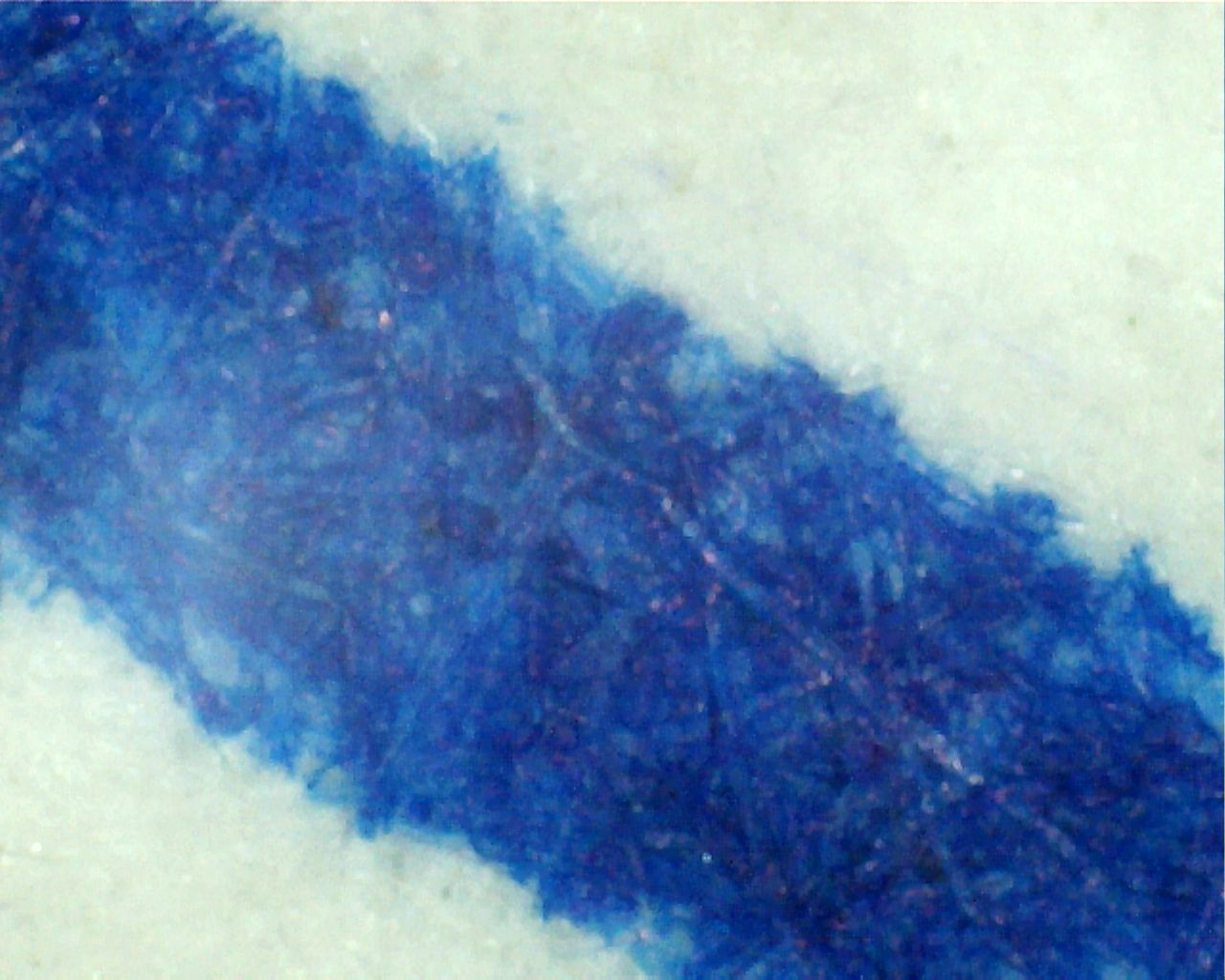
Pen stroke

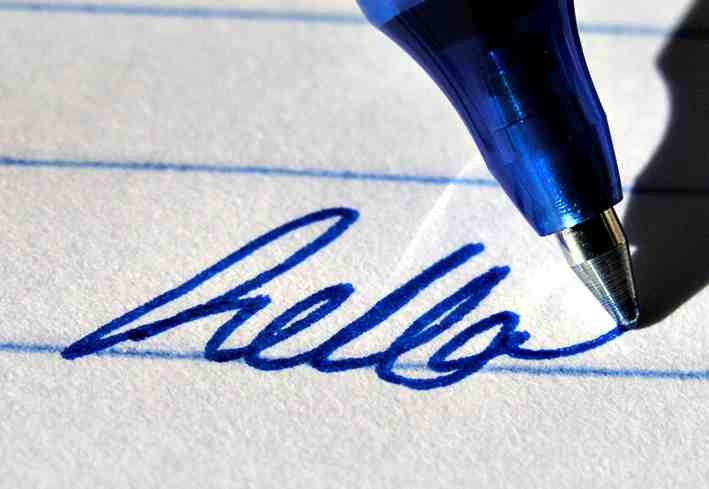
Writing of a gel pen

Compared to other inks, gel ink has higher melting point viscosity, which supports a higher proportion of pigments in the medium. The pigments are typically copper phthalocyanine, carbon black and iron oxides, and the gel is made up of water and biopolymers, such as xanthan gum and tragacanth gum, as well as some types of polyacrylate thickeners. The pigments are opaque, and gel pens are available in several bright and pastel colours, as well as opalescent, metallic, and glittery colours which show up clearly on dark paper. Many gel inks are water resistant, and are not washed away by water once the ink has dried. Fraud resistant gel ink is unaffected by solvents such as acetone, and resists check washing.

Gel ink resists an analytical method commonly used to assess the potential age of ink for forensic purposes. The United States Secret Service has maintained the International Ink Library for many decades. Because manufacturers change their ink formulas slightly from year to year, thin-layer chromatography (TLC) can be used on ink from traditional pens to trace the manufacturer and date of manufacture of most inks. The pigments in gel ink do not dissolve, and therefore cannot be analyzed with TLC.

== Pen tips ==
Gel pen tips are constructed similarly to ballpoint pen tips. The casing is usually made of stainless steel, and the ballpoint is made of carbide or ceramic. The ball diameter is usually between 0.3 and 1.2 mm, although East Asian products are available with diameters as small as 0.2 mm.

== See also ==
- Rollerball pen
- Ballpoint pen
- List of pen types, brands and companies
