= Yard-O-Led =

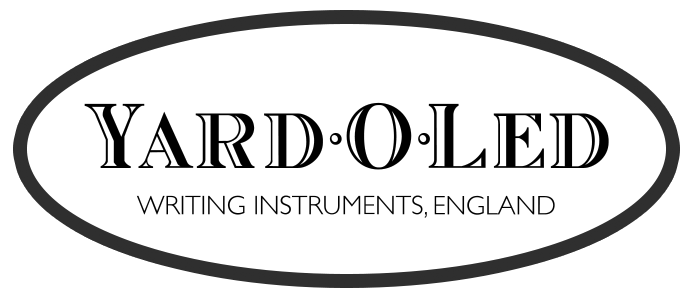
- Type: Private
- Industry: Writing implements
- Founded: 1934; 92 years ago
- Founder: Ludwig Brenne
- Headquarters: London, England
- Key people: Tim Tufnell (Honorary President)
- Products: Fountain and ballpoint pens, mechanical pencils
- Parent: Filofax Group (1988–2015)
- Website: yard-o-led.com

The Yard-O-Led Pencil Company is a manufacturing company founded in London, England in 1934.

== History ==
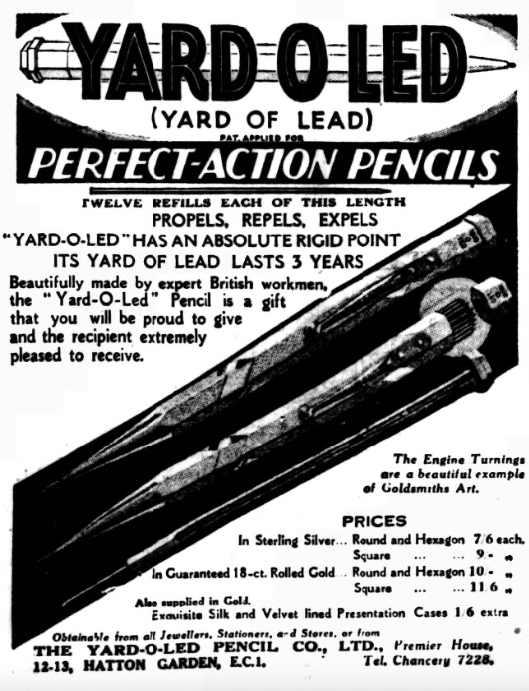
Advert for Yard O Led from Weekly Dispatch (London) 2 December 1934

It was founded by German immigrant Ludwig Brenner to produce his patented propelling pencils which contained twelve three inch leads (that is to say, 36 inches or a yard of lead). Originally based in Premier House, 12-13 Hatton Garden, London, the company relocated in the late 1940s to 1 Great Cumberland Place, London.

After World War II, the company merged with Sampson Mordan Ltd whose founder had patented the first mechanical pencil in 1822. They built a new factory in Birmingham and acquired Edward Baker Ltd, another pencil maker.

In 1988, the company was acquired by Filofax Group, which owned it until 2015, when it was re-established as "Imperial Yard Ltd".

Yard-O-Led continues to produce fountain and ballpoint pens as well as mechanical pencils, most of which are made from hallmarked sterling silver.
