= Carole Hübscher =

Swiss entrepreneur

Carole Hübscher Clements
- Born: 16 April 1967 (age 58)
- Occupation: Entrepreneur
- Known for: CEO of Caran d'Ache

Carole Hübscher Clements (born 16 April 1967) is a Swiss entrepreneur. She has been CEO of Geneva-based colored pencil and stationery manufacturer Caran d'Ache since 2012 and is the fourth generation to head the company. She also holds directorships at Mobiliar and precious metals specialist Cendres + Métaux. Hübscher is married and has three children.

== Career ==
Hübscher graduated from hotel management school in Geneva and initially worked in a hotel. To gain experience abroad, she then worked for the Caran d'Ache wholesaler in the United States for two years. After returning to Switzerland, she began working in Caran d'Ache's international sales department.

In 1997, Hübscher went to the U.S. again and studied at Harvard Business School. In 2012, she said of this education, "It was very concrete work. We regularly had to work out solutions for specific cases from one day to the next. It was very intense, six days a week, but involving. Above all, there were meetings with people from all over the world, from different industries, often of very different kinds, with diverse experiences from which we could all learn."

After returning to Switzerland, she was involved in building Calvin Klein's watch brand. She later worked for the Swiss watch company Swatch for several years and headed the international marketing of the Calvin Klein watch brand.

Since 2002, Hübscher sat on the board of directors of Caran d'Ache, and since 2007 she was prepared by her father to take over the leadership. When asked in 2012 if it was difficult for a woman to succeed three men, she denied it in an interview, saying, "When I was appointed president of the board of directors a few months ago, I received a touching message from the women in the company. They were so proud to see one of their own on the board." Hübscher says she is committed to promoting women in business, but is an opponent of quotas for women.
