= Lead pencil =

Lead pencil may refer to:

- Pencil, a writing implement or art medium usually constructed of a narrow, solid pigment core inside a protective casing
- Mechanical pencil, a pencil with mechanically extendable solid pigment core called a lead
