= Pencil sharpener =

Tool for sharpening a pencil's writing point by shaving away its worn surface

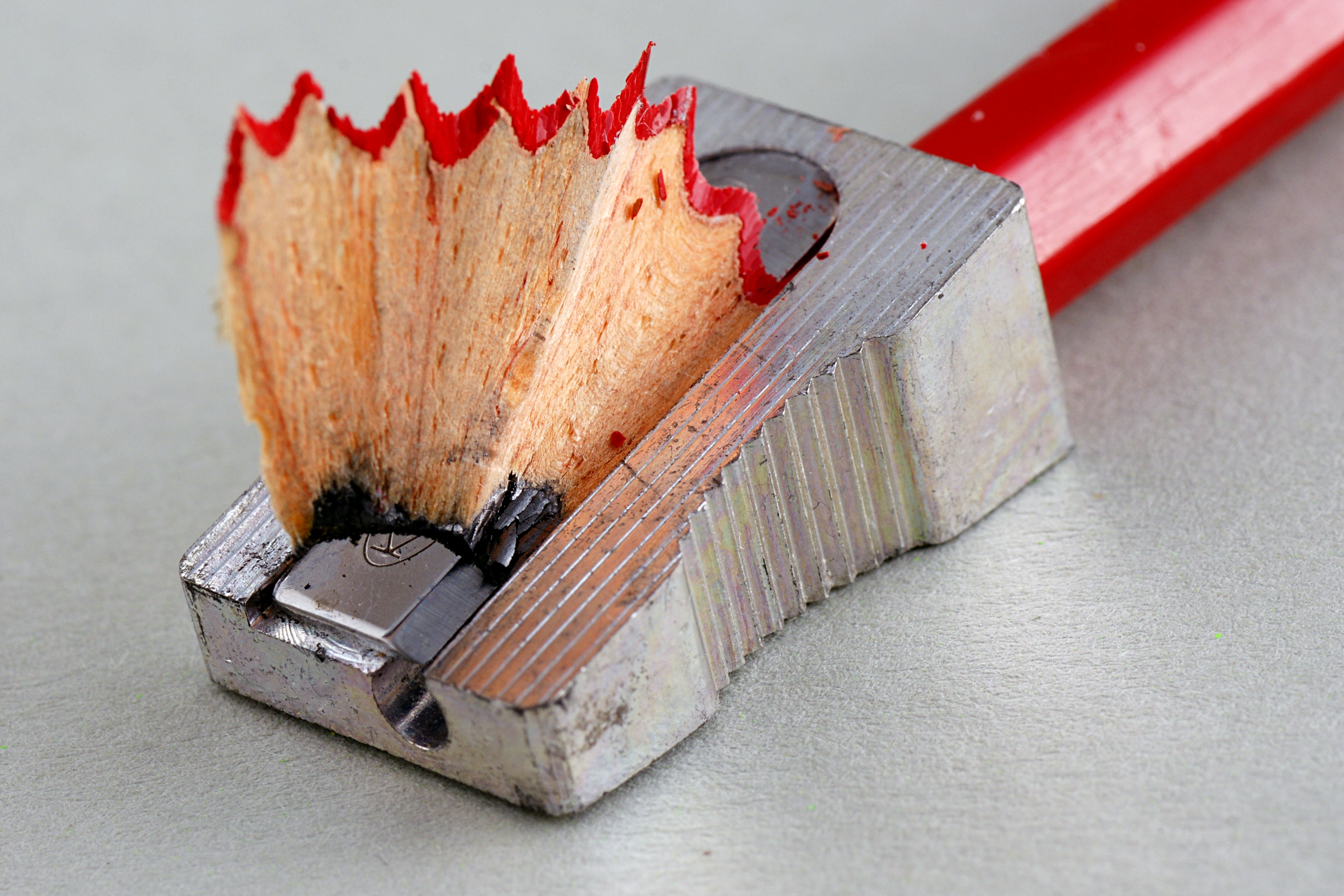
A manual prism sharpener generates long fan-shaped pencil shavings.

Video of a mechanical pencil sharpener, showing gearing and helical sharpening blades

Video showing a manual prism sharpener in use

A pencil sharpener (or pencil pointer, or in Ireland parer or topper) is a tool for sharpening a wood-cased pencil's writing point by shaving away its worn surface. Pencil sharpeners may be operated manually or by an electric motor. Many sharpeners have a casing around them to contain the pencil shavings produced during use.

== History ==
Before the development of dedicated pencil sharpeners, pencils were typically sharpened by shaving with a blade. Often a knife was used to whittle a point.

The development of pencil sharpeners began in France when a French book from 1822 reported in detail about an invention of Mr. C. A. Boucher (Paris) for the construction of a pencil sharpener. He was working with pantographs and apparently needed a device to precisely sharpen the pencils. The device of Mr. Boucher was technically sensible and functional. His idea was also internationally known and recognized, as shown by corresponding reports in German literature at this time. But Mr. Boucher had not applied for a patent for his pencil sharpener. Commercial use of his inventions is unlikely.

French mathematician Bernard Lassimonne (Limoges) applied for the world's first patent (French patent #2444) on a pencil sharpener in 1828. Pencil sharpener devices using his patent were actually produced and sold by Binant, a shop for painting accessories in Paris. In 1833 in England, Cooper & Eckstein patented the so-called Styloxynon, a simple device consisting of two sharp files set together at a right angle in a small block of rosewood. This is the oldest pencil sharpener that has surviving examples.

In the 1830s and 1840s, some French people, all based in Paris, were engaged in construction of simple pencil sharpening tools, like François Joseph Lahausse. These devices were partially sold, but without supra-regional significance. In 1847, the French nobleman Thierry des Estivaux invented a simple hand-held pencil sharpener in its recognizable modern form. The first American pencil sharpener was patented by Walter Kittredge Foster of Bangor, Maine in 1855. He founded a company – the first pencil sharpener company in the world – and produced such small hand-held pencil sharpeners in a large amount. Only a few years later the sharpeners were sold also in Europe as "American pencil sharpeners".

At the end of the 19th century, especially in the United States, pencil sharpeners with various mechanisms had been developed and put on the market. These devices were often heavy and intended for use in schools and universities. Examples are the Perfect Pencil Pointer (Goodell. Co.), the GEM Pencil Sharpener (by Gould & Cook Co.), the Planetary Pencil Sharpener (A. B. Dick Company), all from the US or the Jupiter (Guhl & Harbeck Co.) from Germany. At the beginning of the 20th century the company Automatic Pencil Sharpener Co. (APSCO) was founded and brought out the US Automatic Pencil Sharpener after 1907, which dominated in those years. They later sold machines with milling mechanisms, such as the Climax, Dexter, Wizard, and Junior models. In the next few decades, APSCO became the largest pencil sharpening machine producer in the world and together with a few other US companies, it dominated the market.

Electric pencil sharpeners for offices have been made since at least 1917.

In May 2011, tourism officials in Logan, Ohio, put on display, in its regional welcome center, hundreds of pencil sharpeners which had been collected by Rev. Paul Johnson, an Ohio minister who died in 2010. Johnson, a World War II veteran, had kept his collection of more than 3,400 sharpeners in a small shed, outside his home in Carbon Hill in southeast Ohio. He had started collecting after his wife gave him a few pencil sharpeners as a gift in the late 1980s and kept them organized into categories, including cats, Christmas, and Disneyland.

== Prism ==
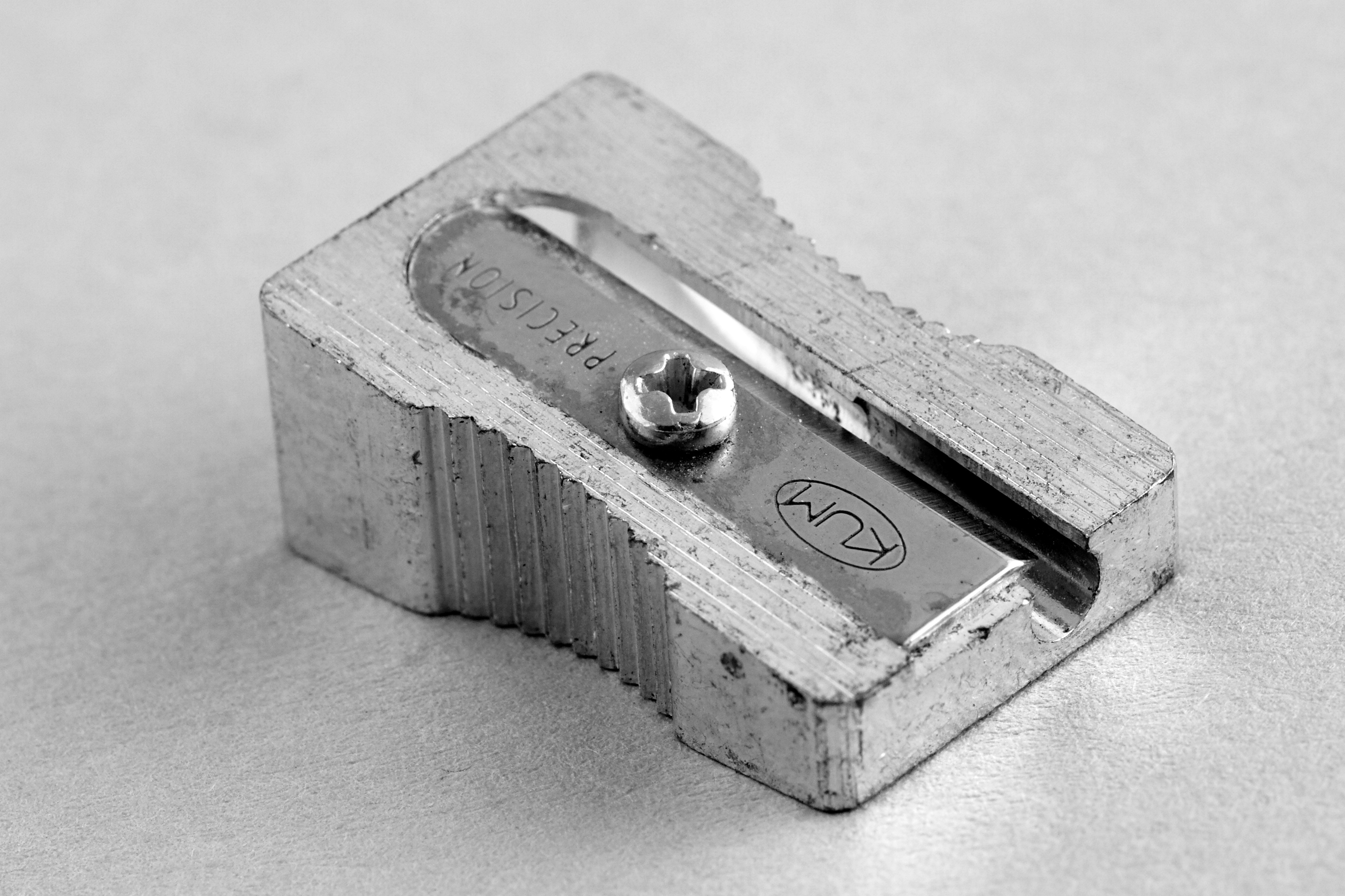
Magnesium alloy prism sharpener

So-called "prism" sharpeners, also called "manual" or "pocket" sharpeners in the United States, have no separate moving parts and are typically the smallest and cheapest commonly used pencil sharpener on the market. The simplest common variety is a small rectangular block, only about 1 × 5/8 × 7/16 inch (2.5 × 1.7 × 1.1 cm) in size. The block-shaped sharpener consists of a combined point-shaping cone that is aligned to the cylindrical pencil alignment guide hole, into which the pencil is inserted. A sharp blade is mounted so that its sharp edge just enters the shaping cone tangentially. The pencil is inserted into the sharpener and rotated while the sharpener is held motionless. The body of the sharpener is often contoured, ridged or grooved to make the small block easier to firmly grip, and is typically made of aluminum alloy, magnesium alloy or hard plastic.

The blade inside the sharpener shaves the wood and graphite tip of the pencil, while the shavings emerge through a slot along the blade edge. It is important that the cylindrical alignment hole closely fits the diameter of the pencil, to keep the pencil from wobbling, which would cause stepped or lurching cut-depths and point breakage. Another important feature is a larger clearance hole at the end of the cone allowing sections of the pencil lead which break away to be removed with only minor inconvenience. Prism sharpeners can be bare or enclosed in a container to collect the shavings, while some enclosed sharpeners may be harder to clear in the event of a blockage.

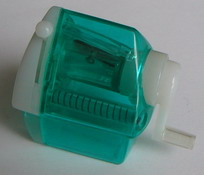
An unusual hand-cranked prism sharpener with a shavings cover

A few prism sharpeners are hand-cranked, rotating the cutting blade instead of rotating the pencil. Prism sharpeners may be right- or left-handed, requiring clockwise or counter-clockwise rotation of the pencil being sharpened. Moderate care is needed to not break the tip of the pencil being sharpened, requiring the pencil to be sharpened again. Because pencils may have different standard diameters in different nations, imported sharpeners may have non-standard-sized alignment guide-holes, making sharpening attempts difficult. If the alignment hole is too small, the pencil cannot be inserted; if it is too large, the tip of the pencil will repeatedly break off.

=== Linear blade ===
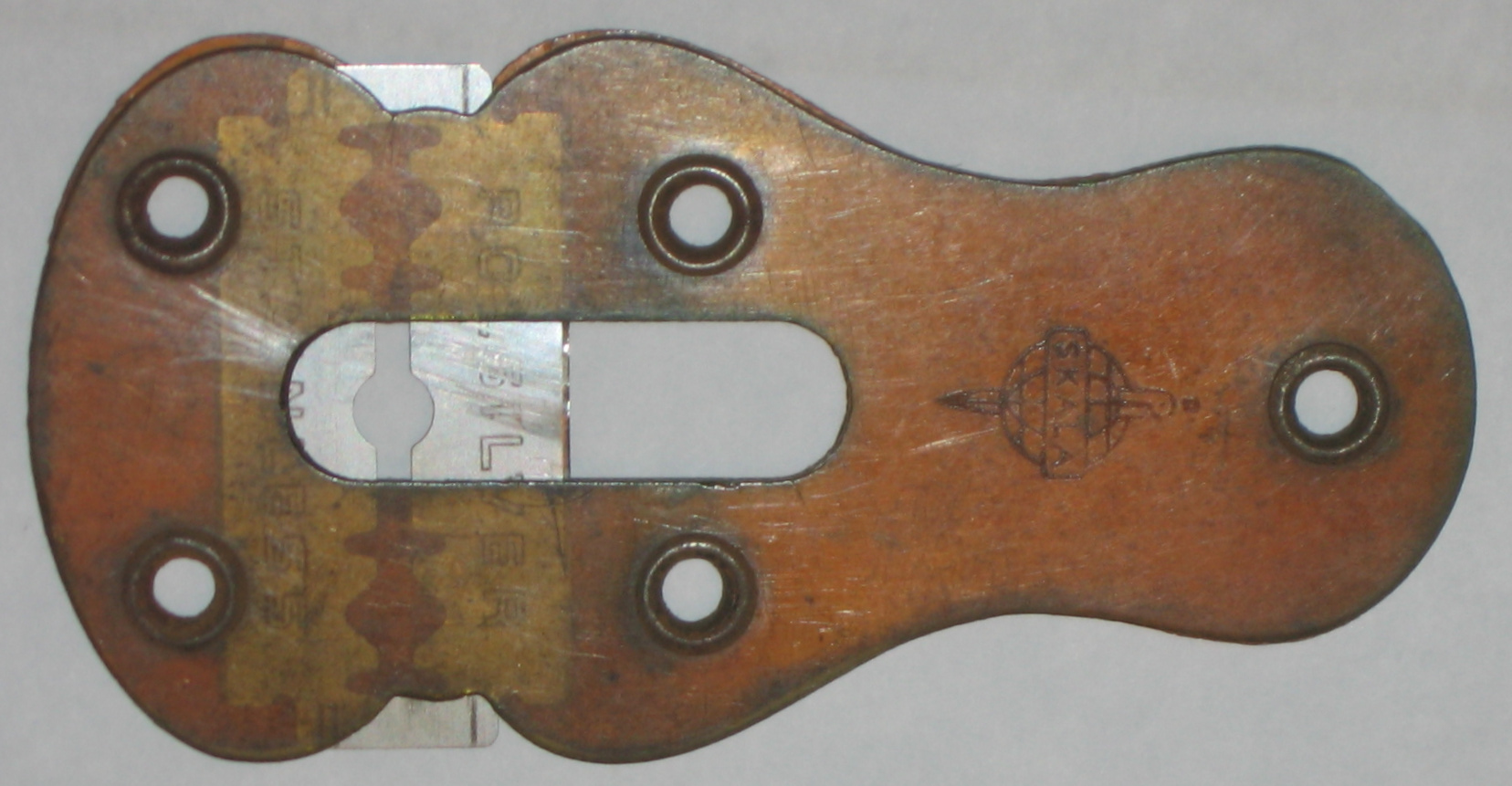
A linear sharpener designed to use a razor blade

Unlike prism sharpeners, linear blade sharpeners do not rotate relative to the pencil being sharpened, and may be viewed as just a special form of knife, with a mechanical guide for increased safety and convenience. Some models allow the use of replaceable shaving razor blades, while others have permanently-fitted blades. Linear blade sharpeners may require more skill, but they allow one to sharpen the tip of the pencil into any desired shape and angle of taper, whereas prism sharpeners have a fixed sharpening angle and produce circular symmetry.

While most linear blade sharpeners are simple and directly hand-operated, some devices in the past were crank-operated, using mechanisms to convert crank rotation into linear motion.

=== Cylindrical (planetary) ===
These mechanisms are also called planetary sharpeners, in reference to their use of planetary gears. A larger, stationary planetary sharpener can be mounted on a desk or wall and powered by a hand crank. Typically, the pencil is inserted into the sharpener with one hand, and the crank is turned with the other. This rotates a set of helical cylindrical cutters in the mechanism, set at an acute angle to each other. The multiple cutting edges quickly sharpen the pencil, with a more precise finish than a single-blade device. Some cylindrical sharpeners have only one helical cutter cylinder, but most have two cylinders or more.

Most planetary sharpeners have a large opening, with a rotatable guide disk in front of it that has multiple holes of different sizes, to accommodate pencils of many different diameters. Advanced models have a spring-driven holder for the pencil, so that the pencil automatically is pushed into the mechanism while being sharpened. Some versions also offer a regulator of the desired sharpness, since it is not always desired to make the graphite core needle-sharp.

=== Other systems ===
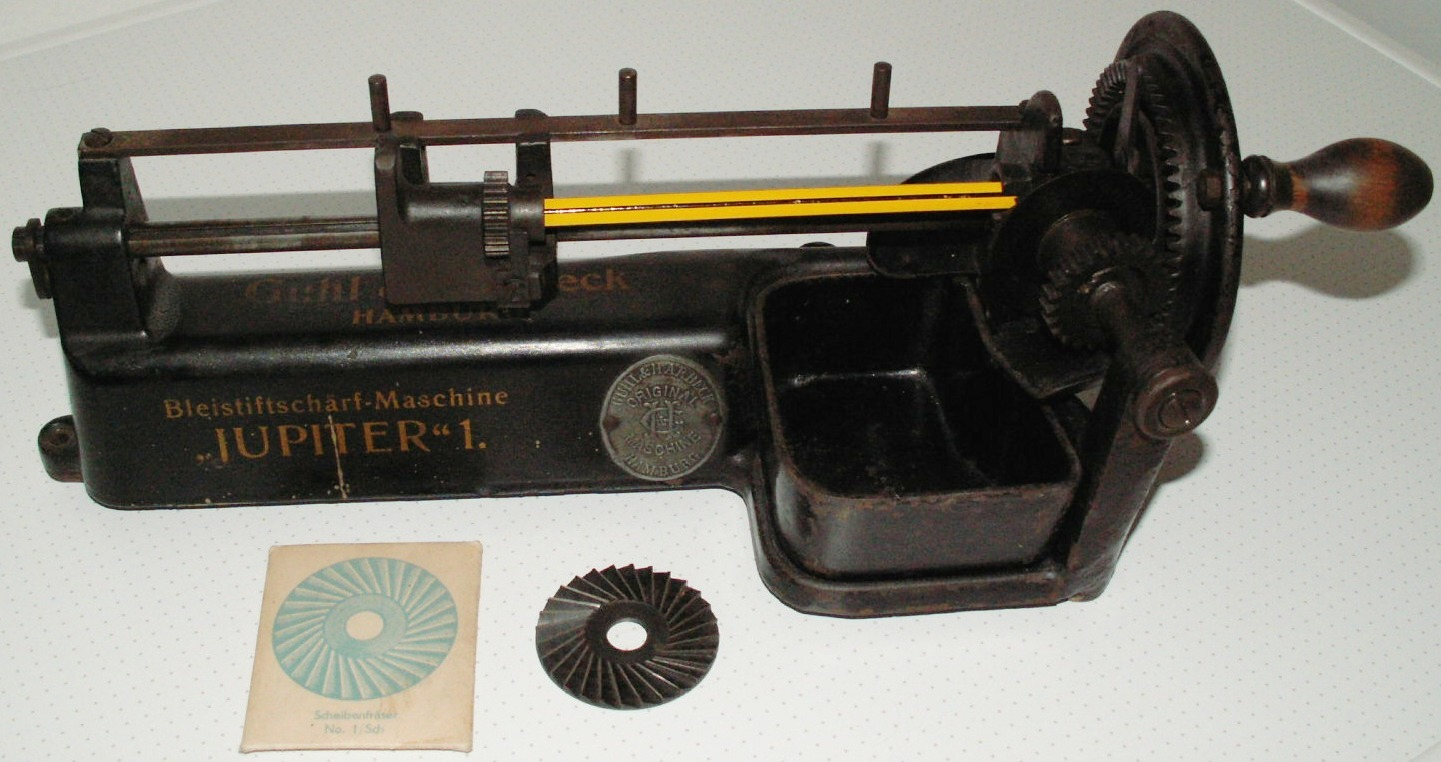
Jupiter 1 with rotary disk cutters

Some older models like the 1897 German Jupiter 1 used reversible rotary cutter-disks with cutting edges radiating from the center on each side. These were high-end models, quite large and expensive. Others simply used abrasives like sandpaper. In some cases an abrasive was used to shape the graphite core, while the wood was cut some other way.

== Electric ==
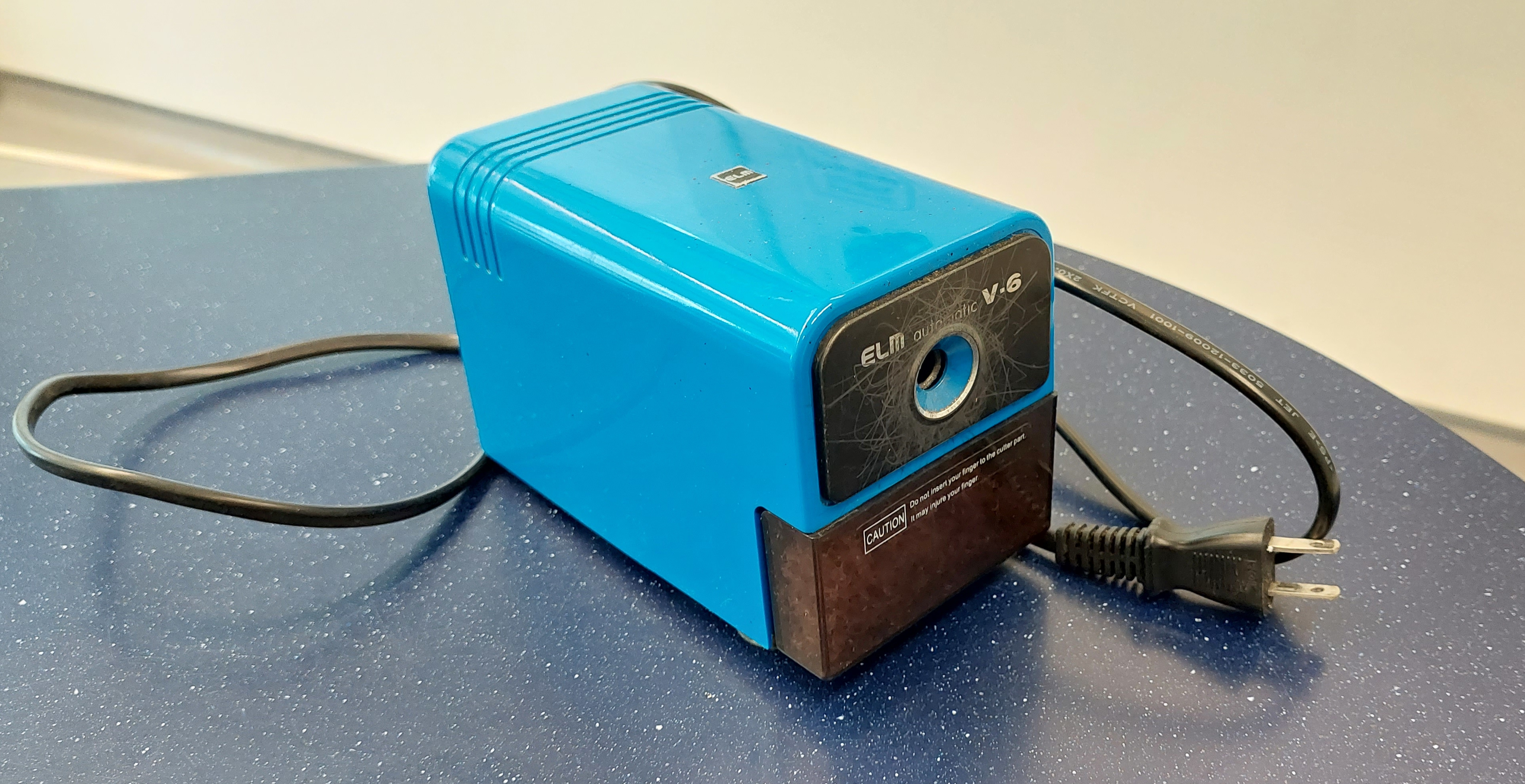
A well-used modern desk-style electric pencil sharpener

The oldest surviving electric pencil sharpener is the Boston Polar Cub pencil sharpener, introduced around 1936. Electric pencil sharpeners work on the same principle as manual ones, but one or more flat-bladed or cylindrical cutters are rotated by an electric motor. Some electric pencil sharpeners are powered by batteries rather than being plugged into a building's electrical system, making them more portable.

Auto-stop electric pencil sharpeners are able to sense when the tip of the pencil is long enough, so they stop automatically. In basic automatic pencil sharpeners, the lead may become too long and break, and so users must be careful to supervise the operation.

== Specialized ==
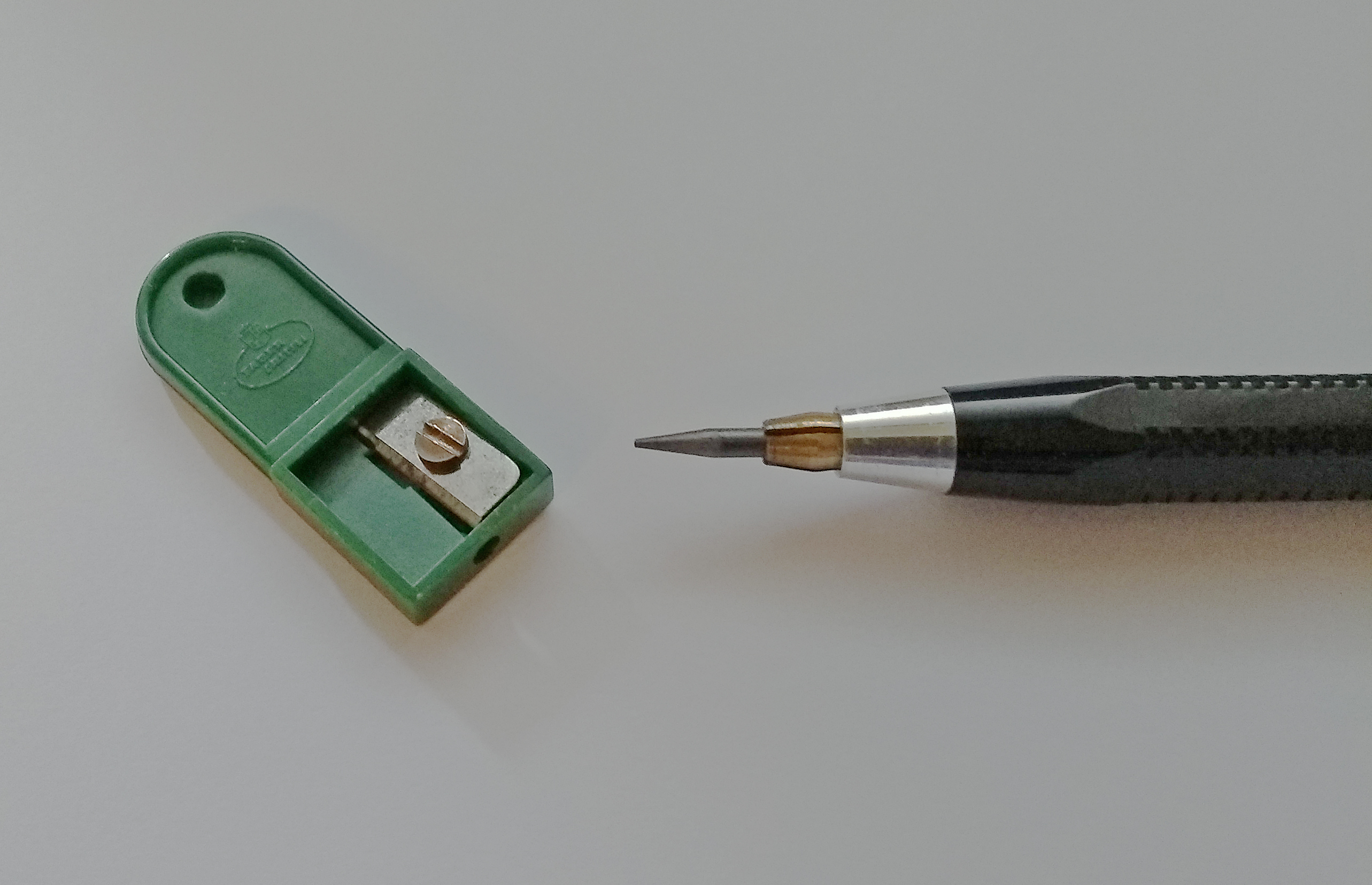
Lead sharpener/lead pointer and 2 mm pencil lead in a leadholder

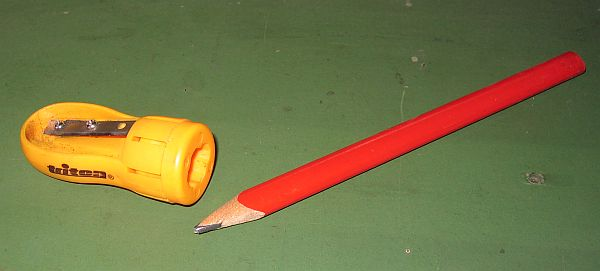
Specialized sharpener for carpenter's flat pencils

Specialized sharpeners are available that operate on non-standard sizes of pencil-shaped markers, such as wax crayons used in primary schools. Sharpeners that have two openings, one for normal pencils and one for larger crayons, are fairly common. Sharpeners with a single blade for use on wax crayons are available, and sometimes included in boxes of crayons. These often have plastic blades, which are adequate for the soft wax.

An artist's or draftsman's pencil sharpener leaves the graphite untouched and sharpens only the wood (some models can switch from standard to wood-only by an adjustment). The graphite lead is then honed to a sharp point with a lead pointer, which sharpens only the lead without wood. Lead pointers are also used with mechanical leadholders, with thicker diameter leads like 2 mm which have removable/refillable leads. Some sharpeners which function as a long point sharpener, have a second hole in which the blade sharpens the untouched graphite to a long, more precise point than would be otherwise possible using a single hole long point sharpener.

Carpenters may use carpenter pencils, the flattened shape of which stops them from rolling away, while still providing a constant line width. These pencils were traditionally sharpened with tools conveniently to hand, such as a plane or sandpaper. Rotating pencil sharpeners are now available for these pencils, in which a rotating plastic collar holds the pencil in position, although they then sharpen to the usual conical point as for a round pencil, abandoning some distinctive aspects of the carpenter's pencil. Alternatively, a special carpenter's pencil sharpener can be used, which has a sliding mechanism that leaves flat facets on the lead, in a manner similar to hand sharpening with a sharp knife.

Mechanical pencils with thin diameter leads dispense the graphite lead progressively during use and thus do not require sharpening; such pencils are sometimes called "self-sharpening". A type of mechanical pencil has a rotating gear mechanism which rotates the lead slightly every time the lead is lifted off the paper, helping to maintain a consistent, sharp point. If a finer or broader line is needed, a separate mechanical pencil using a lead with a different diameter is required.

== Gallery ==
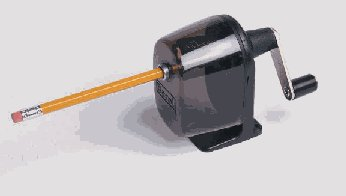
Hand-cranked planetary sharpener, with cover in place

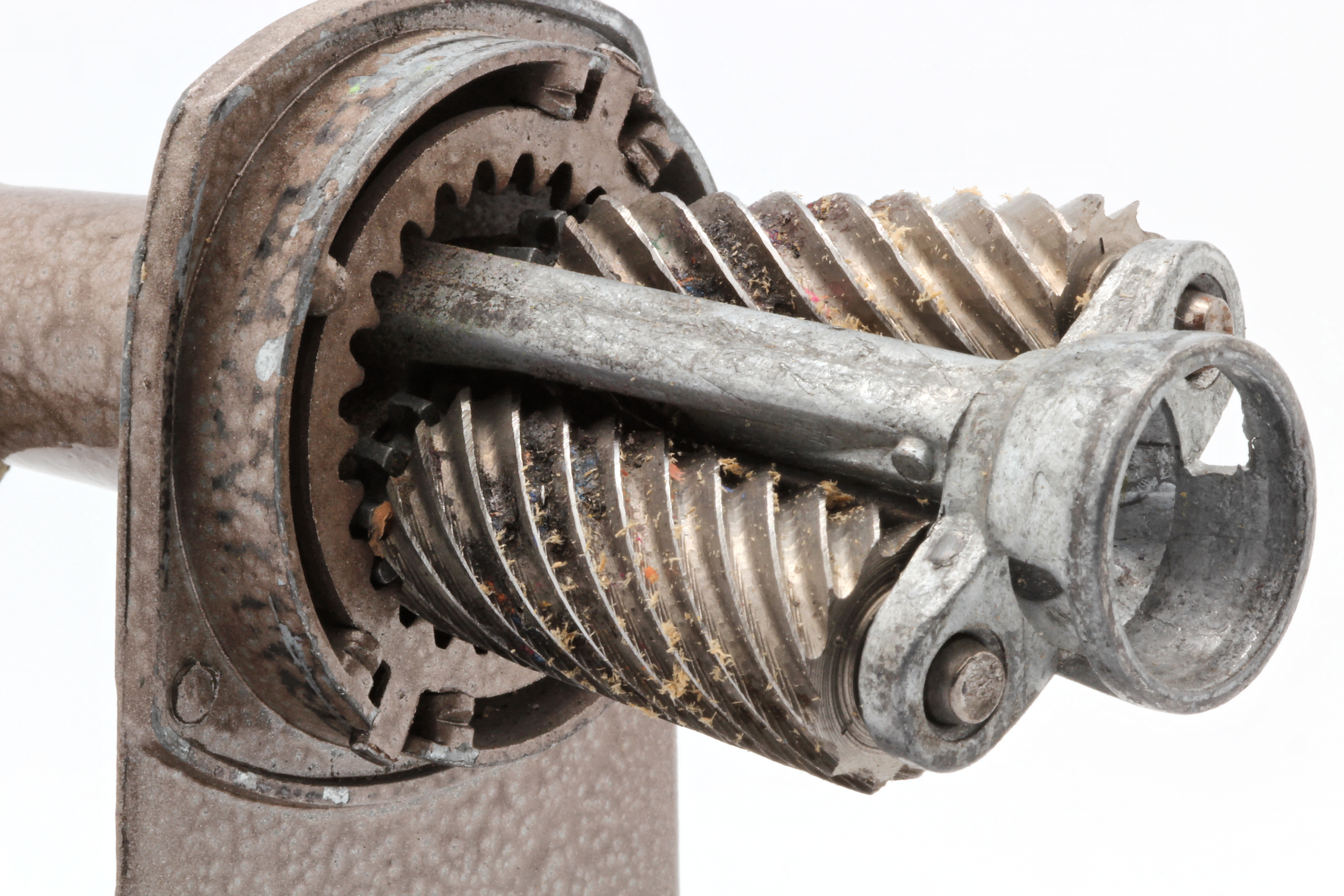
Hand-cranked planetary sharpener from 1950 to 1960, with cover removed

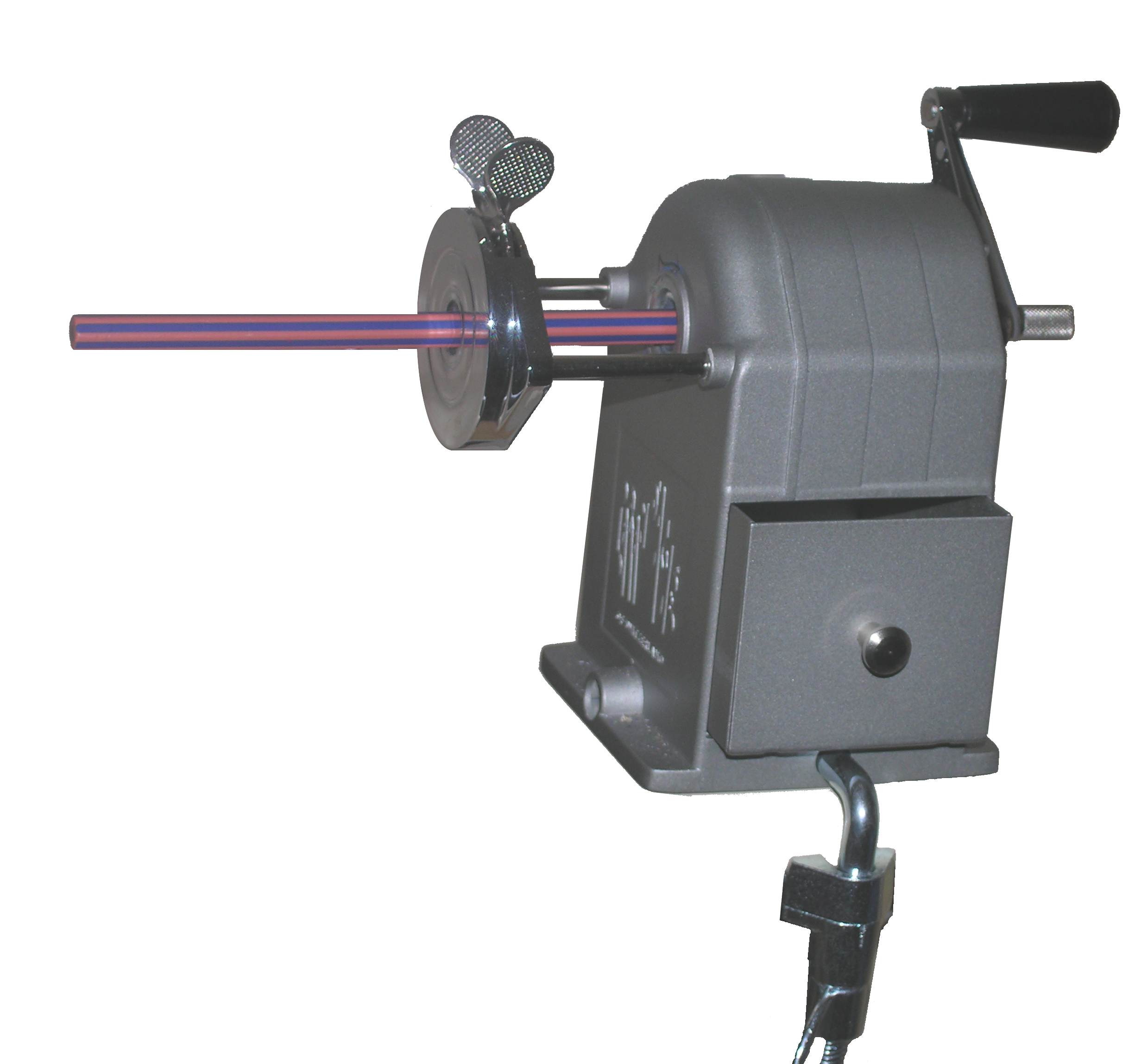
Hand-cranked planetary sharpener with spring-driven pencil holder. The small knob behind the crank is a sharpness regulator.

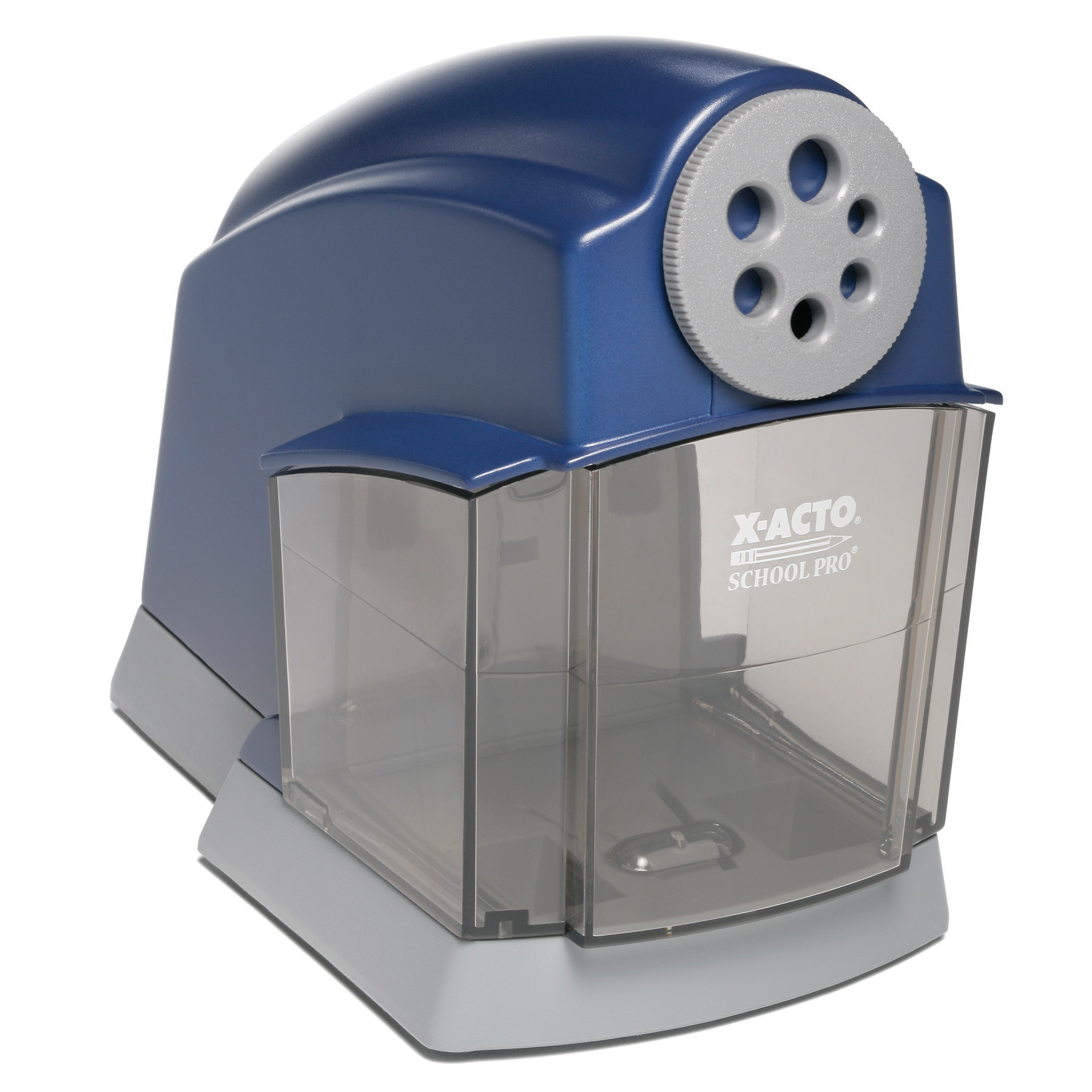
AC-powered electric pencil sharpener. The mechanism is similar to the planetary sharpener, except there is a motor instead of a crank.

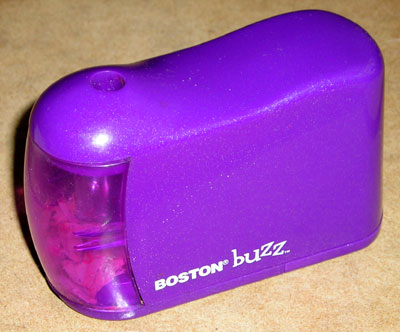
Battery-operated sharpener

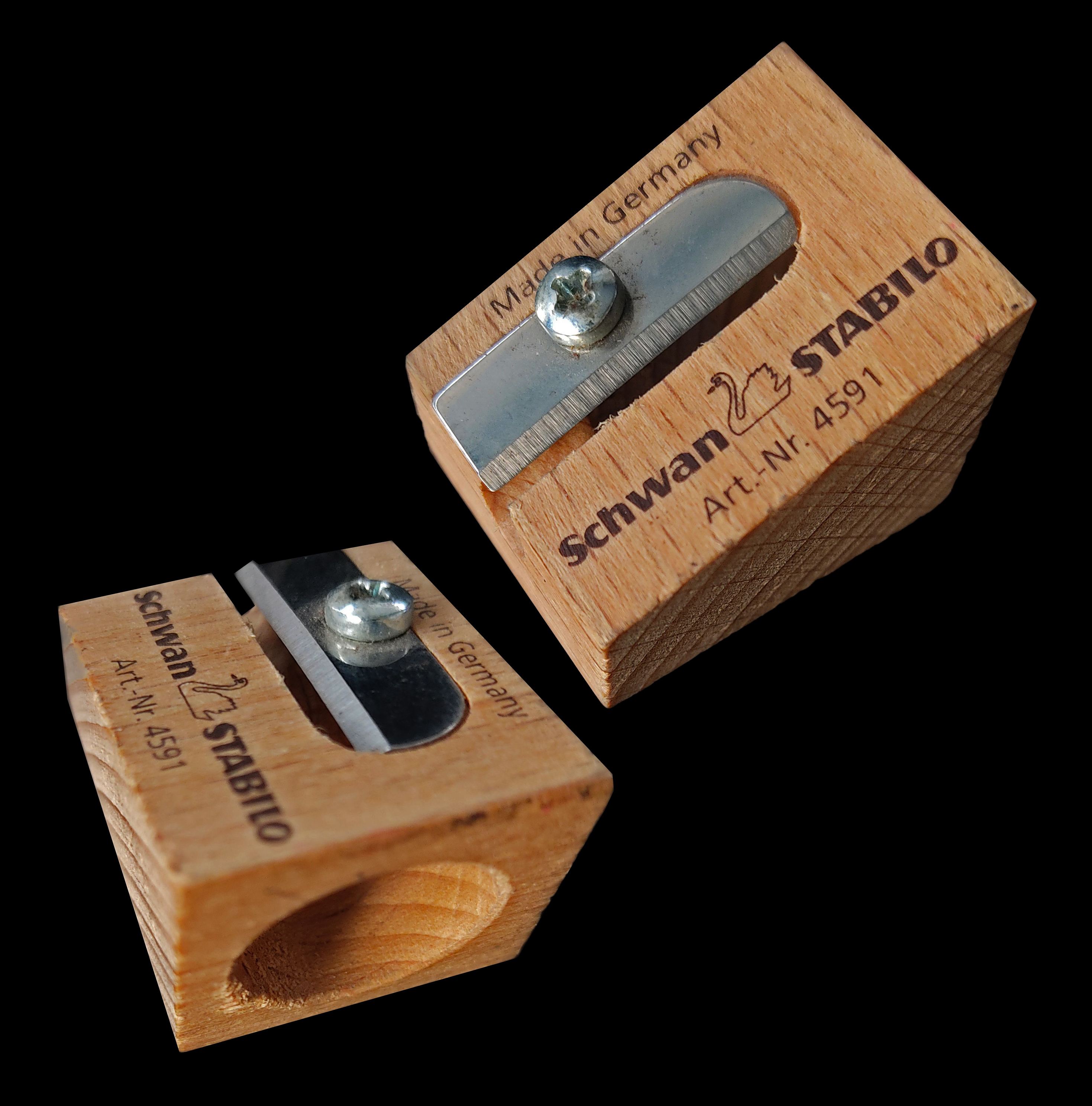
Ecologically manufactured pencil sharpener made of wood

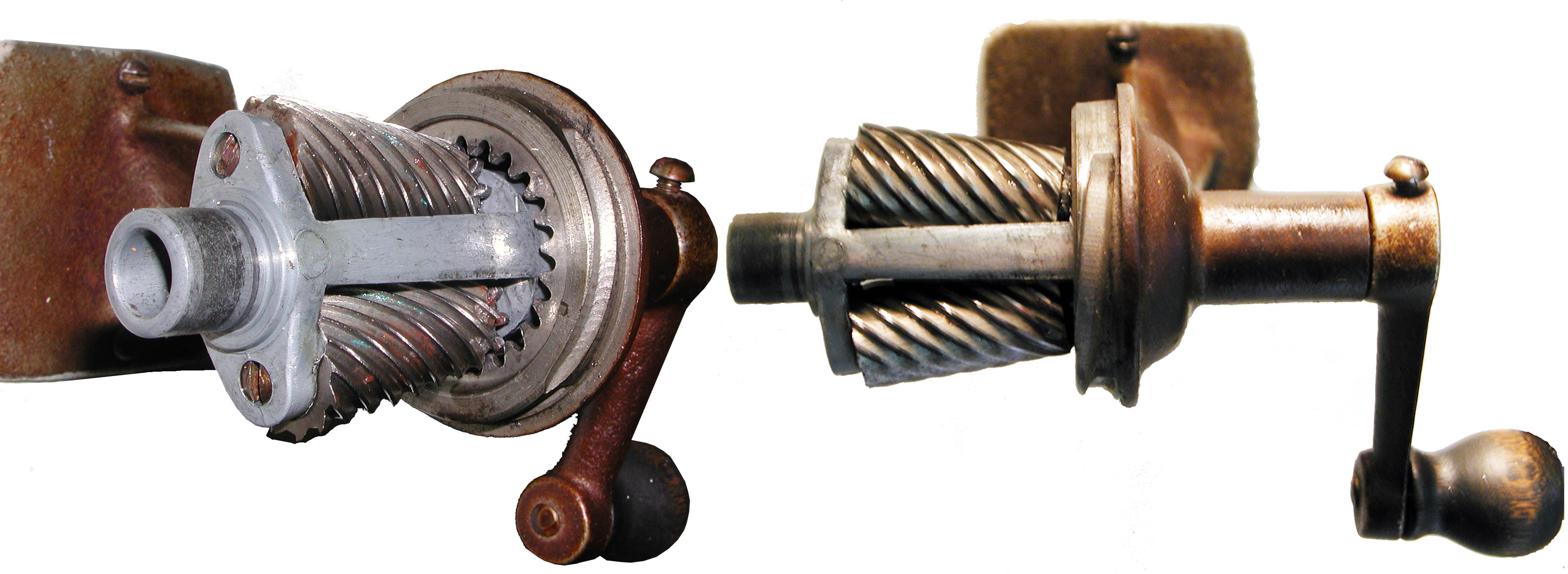
A wall-mounted planetary sharpener (casing removed to reveal the mechanism)

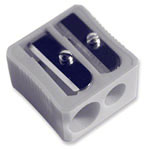
Prism sharpener with two holes for two sizes of pencils

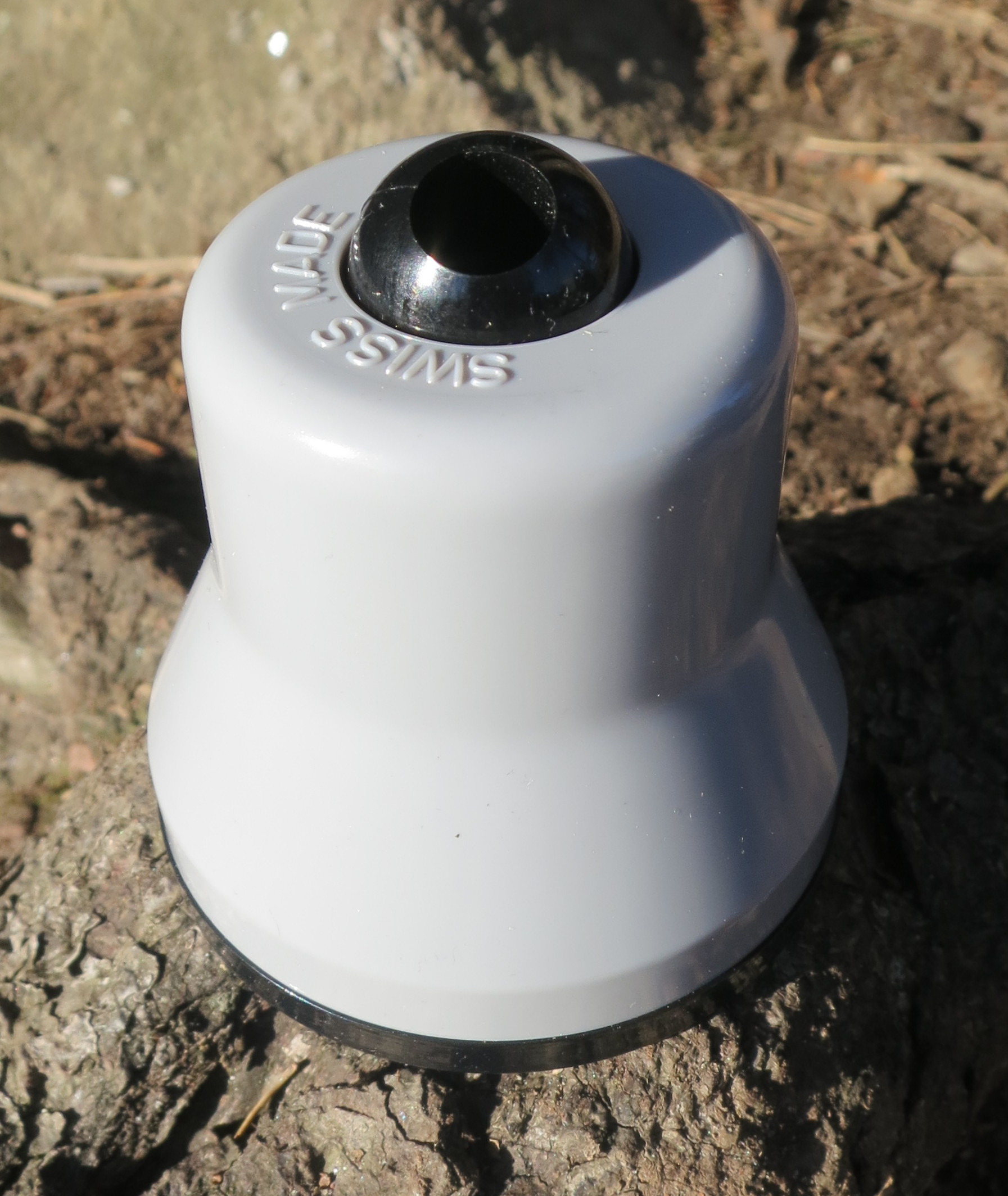
A Swiss Gedess sharpener where sharpening is accomplished by swirling hand rotation

== See also ==
- Mechanical pencil
- Pencil Sharpener Museum
