= Tokuji Hayakawa =

Japanese businessman (1893–1980)

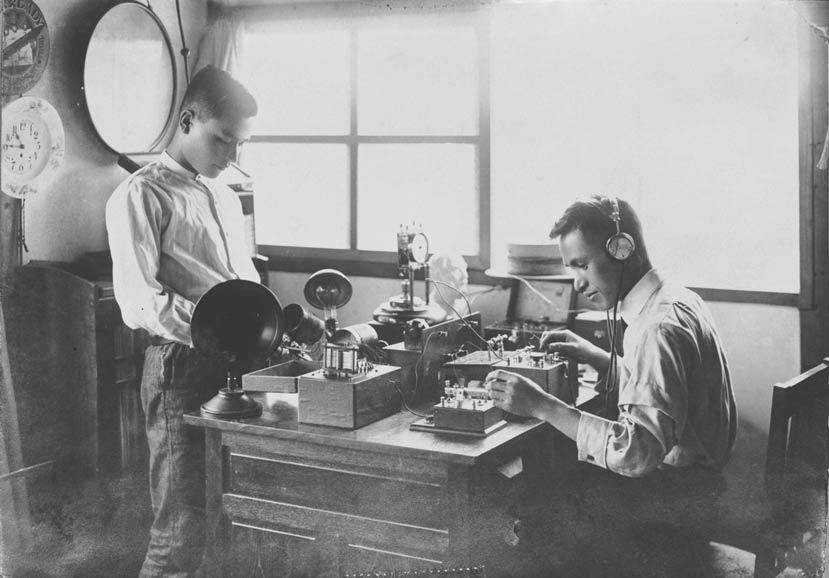
- Hayakawa (right) testing a crystal radio (1925)
- Born: November 3, 1893; Tokyo, Japan
- Died: June 24, 1980 (aged 86)
- Occupation: businessman
- Known for: founder of Sharp Corporation, inventor of the Ever-Ready Sharp Pencil

Tokuji Hayakawa (早川 徳次, Hayakawa Tokuji; November 3, 1893 – June 24, 1980) was a Japanese businessman and the founder of Hayakawa Kinzoku Kōgyō (the present-day Sharp Corporation). He invented and patented the “Tokubijō” belt buckle in 1912 (a belt which can fasten without perforating) and invented the "Ever Ready Sharp" mechanical pencil (from which his company would later get its name) in 1915.

The success of the “Tokubijō” belt buckle led to Hayakawa starting his own metallurgical processing, which then developed into the present-day Sharp Corporation.

== Life ==
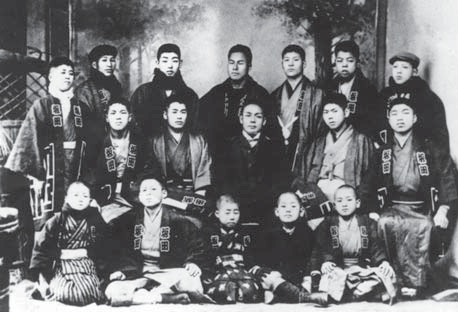
Hayakawa (aged 13; front row, far right) during his apprenticeship at the metallic ornament workshop, and his coworkers (c. 1906–7)

Hayakawa was born in Tokyo in 1893. Due to difficult domestic circumstances, he was adopted by the Ideno family. He left primary school after second grade due to his family’s poverty and was apprenticed to a maker of metallic ornaments.

Hayakawa was inspired to invent a new belt that could be fastened to any length and developed a buckle that used a roller to fasten a belt without puncturing it. Tokuji applied for a patent, using the name “Tokubijō.” When Hayakawa launched his buckle in 1912, demand in Japan for the buckle increased with the spread of Western-style fashions.

The first order for the Tokubijō buckle was huge — 33 grosses or 4,752 in total. Tokuji decided to produce his buckle independently. He borrowed most of the capital and opened his own manufacturing operation in September 1912. His manufacturing process steadily improved, and the business expanded.

In 1913, Hayakawa acquired the patent of an innovative water faucet, and in 1915, he developed the prototype of the Sharp automatic pencil still sold today. Later, he expanded his enterprise into electronics manufacturing of radios, tape-recorders and televisions. He was also active in social welfare programs. He died in 1980 at the age of 86.

== Honors ==
Translated from the article in the Japanese Wikipedia

=== National ===
- Medal of Honor with Blue Ribbon (1960)
- Order of the Sacred Treasure, Gold and Silver Star, Second Class (1976) (Third Class: 1965)

=== Other ===
- Award from the city of Osaka (1968)
- Okochi Production Award (1971)
- Osaka Cultural Award (1971)
- 29th NHK Broadcasting Culture Award (1978)
