= Mechanical pencil =

Pencil with a replaceable lead

A typical construction of a ratchet-based mechanical pencil

A mechanical pencil or clutch pencil is a pencil with a replaceable and mechanically extendable solid pigment core called a "pencil lead" (/ˈlɛd/), which is often made of graphite and not bonded to the outer casing, thus the user can mechanically extend it, as it is worn away from use, and bring it in when not in use. Mechanical pencils often include erasers. Mechanical pencils were first used in the 18th century. The first mass-produced mechanical pencil, the Eversharp (originally "Ever Sharp"), was patented in 1913 by Charles Keeran.

Other names include: microtip pencil, automatic pencil, drafting pencil, technical pencil, draughting pencil, click pencil (generally refers to a specific brand), pump pencil, leadholder, Pacer (Australian English, ca. the 1980s), propelling pencil (British and Australian English, often refers to higher-end mechanical pencils), pen pencil (Indian English), sharp pencil (Japanese English, shortened genericised form of Eversharp Pencil) and lead pencil (Bangladeshi and American English).

Mechanical pencils are used to provide lines of constant width, without need of sharpening, for tasks such as technical drawing as well as for clean looking writing. They are also used for fine-art drawing. Since they do not have to be sharpened, they are also popular with students.

== History ==
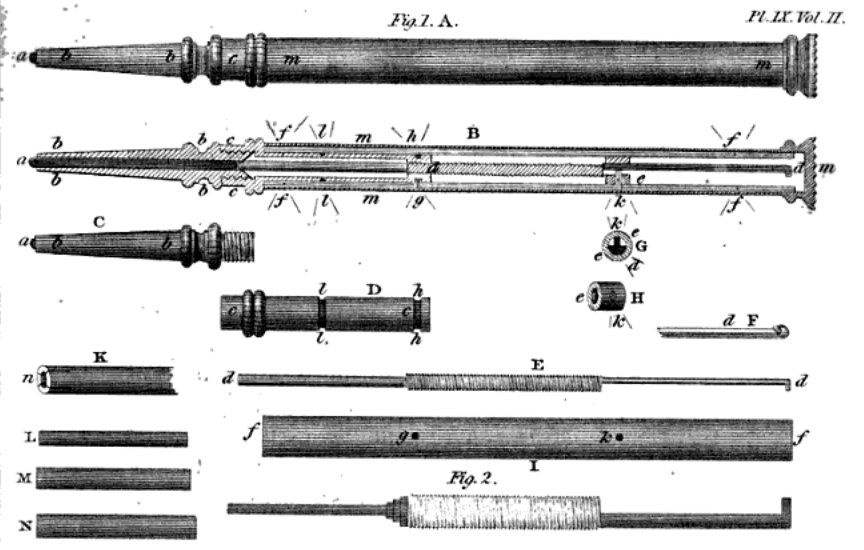
Detail of the first patent for a mechanical pencil. Sampson Mordan, 1822.

Conrad Gessner described a lead holder pencil in 1565, but the lead had to be manually advanced and sharpened. The earliest extant datable example of a mechanical pencil was found aboard the wreckage of HMS Pandora, which sank in 1791.

The first patent for a refillable pencil with lead-propelling mechanism was issued to Sampson Mordan and John Isaac Hawkins in Britain in 1822. After buying out Hawkins' patent rights, Mordan entered into a business partnership with Gabriel Riddle from 1823 to 1837. The earliest Mordan pencils are thus hallmarked SMGR. After 1837, Mordan ended his partnership with Riddle and continued to manufacture pencils as "S. Mordan & Co". His company continued to manufacture pencils and a wide range of silver objects until World War II, when the factory was bombed.

Between 1822 and 1874, more than 160 patents were registered pertaining to a variety of improvements to mechanical pencils. The first spring-loaded mechanical pencil was patented in 1877. Two of the most popular 19th-century lead sizes were 1.5 and 1.03 mm, "VS" and "M", respectively. Many other sizes were in use, however, before the Eversharp's success made its .046 inch lead size a de facto standard (this size has been variously metricized as 1.1, 1.18, and 1.2 mm, all nominal sizes). Thinner .036 inch (0.9 mm) lead was introduced in the later 1930s and gradually became the new standard, eventually being displaced by 0.7 mm. Many thinner sizes later became available, as well as thicker leads such as 1.4 and 2.0 mm.

The first modern mechanical pencil was the Eversharp (originally "Ever Sharp"), invented by Charles R. Keeran who applied for the key patent in 1913. It has been described as "the first mass-produced mechanical pencil to combine a simple propelling mechanism with large lead capacity and robust, ergonomically sound design ... that redefined the mechanical pencil as a mass-market product, to the extent that "eversharp" came to be widely used as a generic term for a mechanical pencil." More that 12,000,000 Eversharp pencils had been sold by the early 1920s, and its design was widely copied.

A pioneering mechanical pencil in Japan was invented in 1915 by Tokuji Hayakawa, a metalworker who had just finished his apprenticeship. It was patented in Japan in 1920 and marketed as the "Ever-Ready Sharp Pencil". Although it has been claimed that large numbers were sold, surviving Ever-Ready Sharps are rare. In 1923, the Hayakawa Brothers factory was destroyed in the Great Kantō earthquake. By 1924, Tokuji Hayakawa had turned his attention to the manufacture of radios, but his first invention was immortalized in the name of his new company: Sharp.

== Mechanism types ==
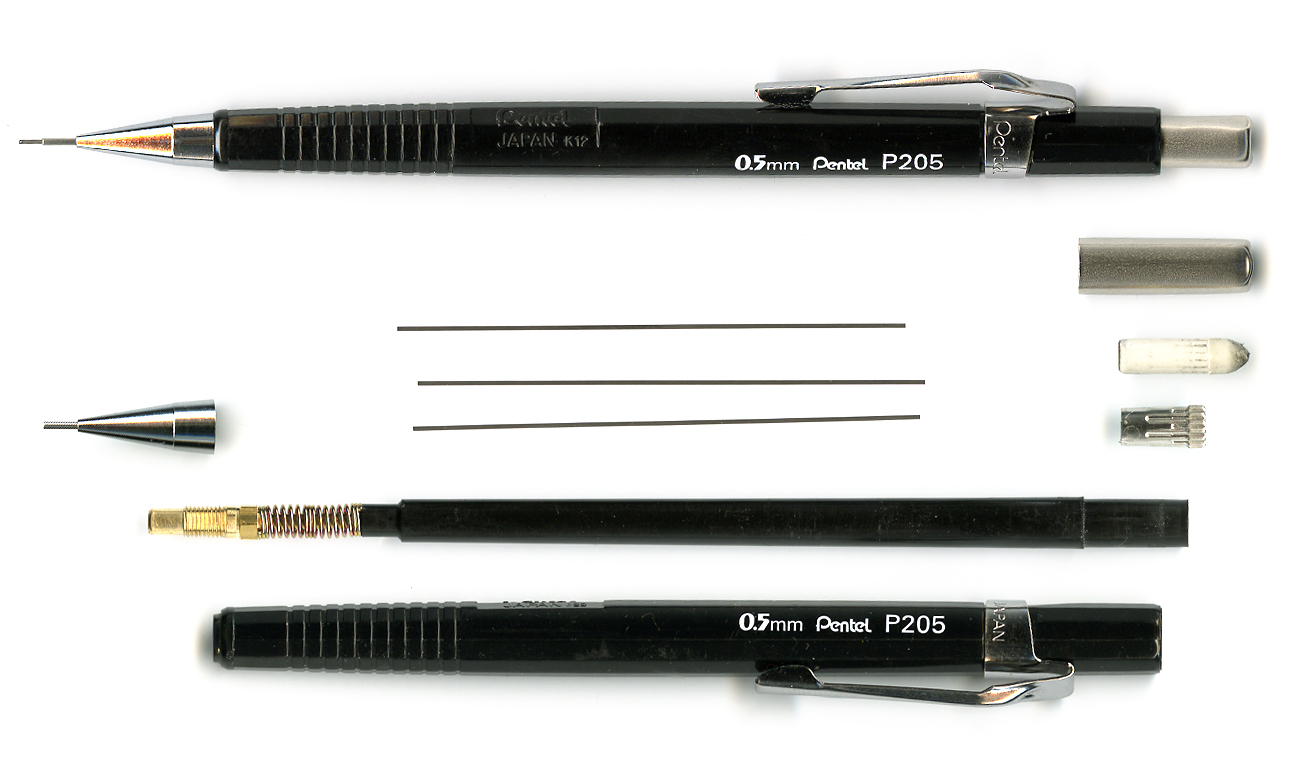
A Pentel Sharp ratchet drafting pencil disassembled, showing three 0.5 mm graphite leads.

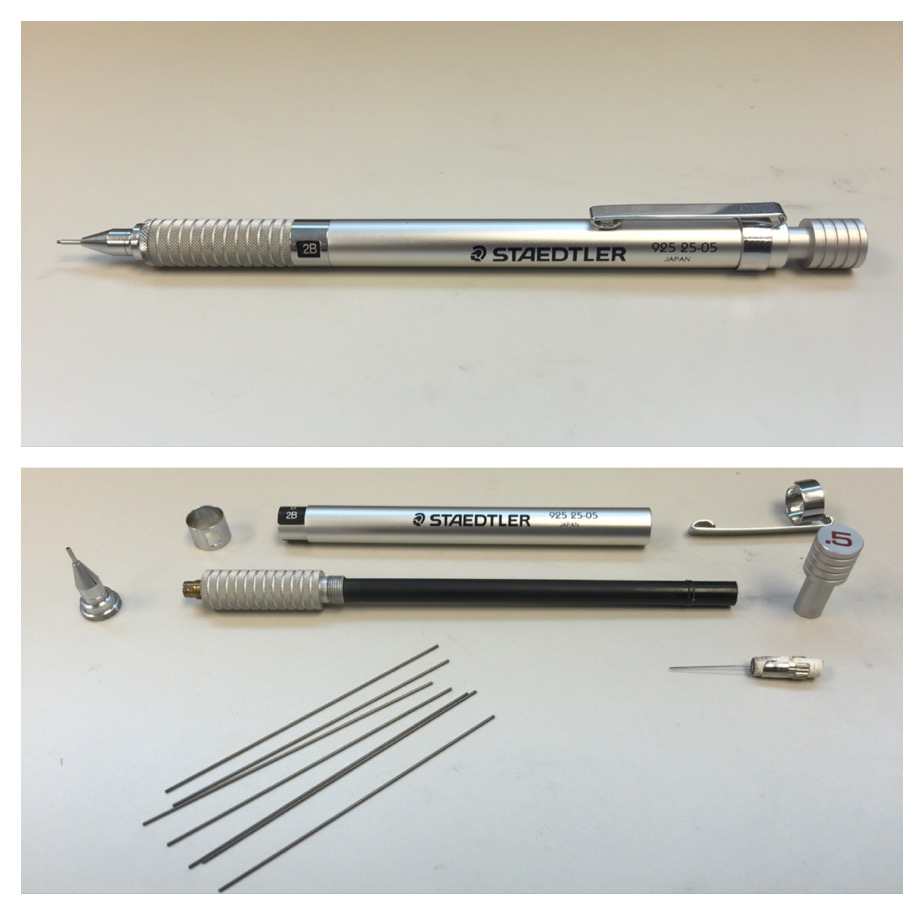
A Staedtler 925-25 05, assembled (top) and disassembled (bottom).

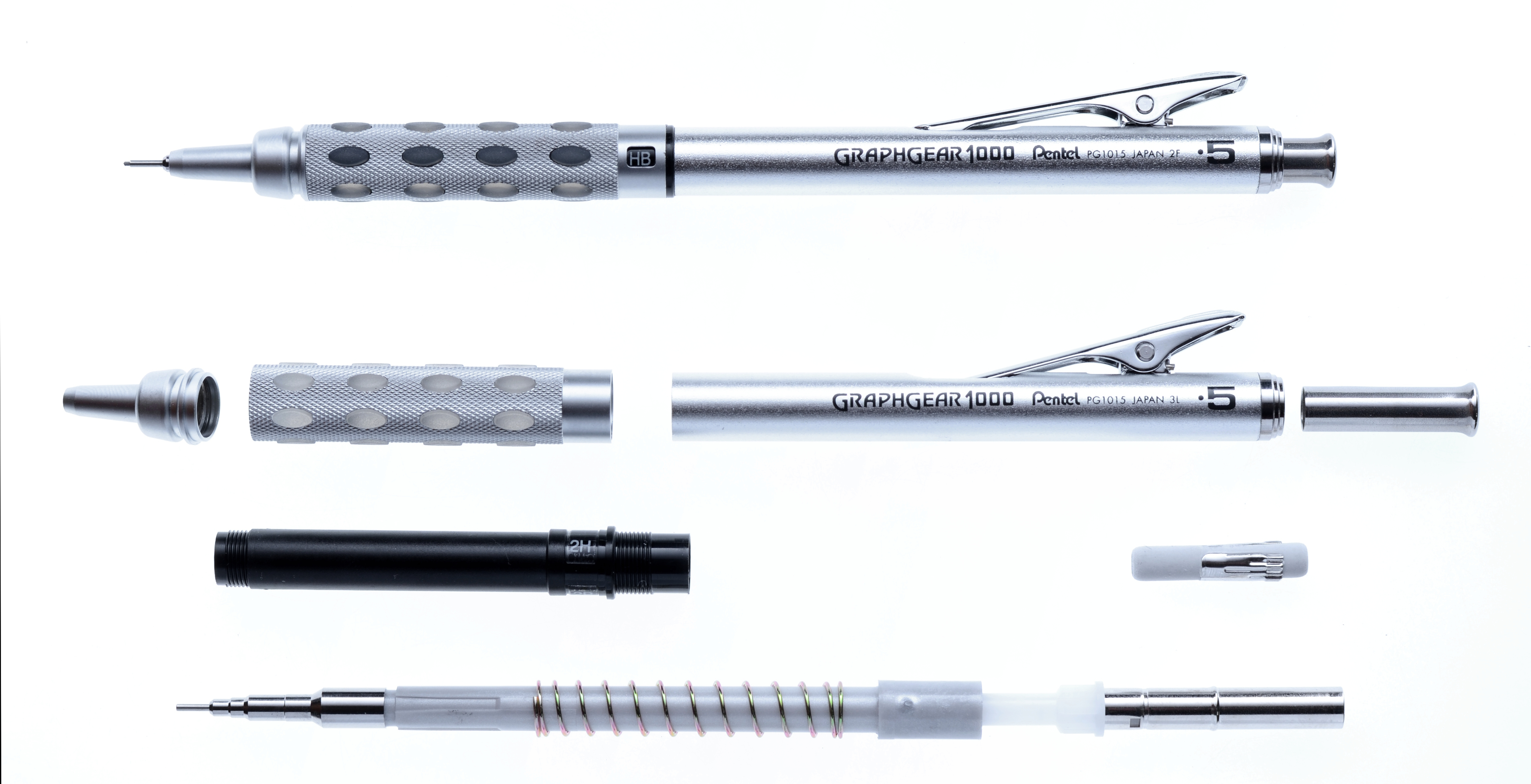
A Pentel GraphGear 1000, featuring a clip-operated retractable lead guide pipe and lead hardness grade indicator set at HB.

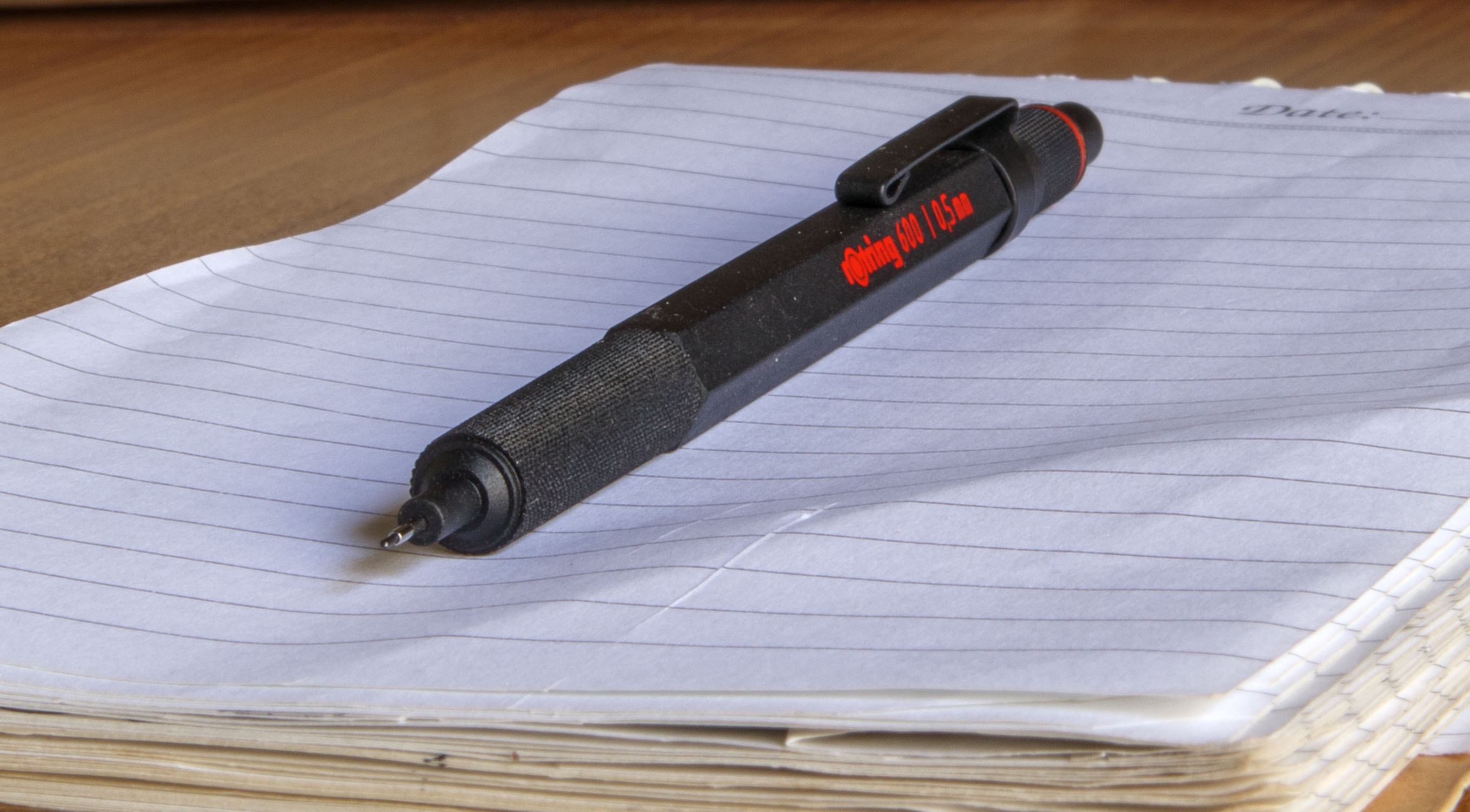
Rotring 600 metal body with matte coating.

Mechanical pencils can be divided into two basic types: those that both hold the lead and can actively propel it forward, and those that only hold the lead in position.

Screw-based pencils advance the lead by twisting a screw mechanism, which moves a propelling pin or lead carrier down the barrel of the pencil. Lead is not fed from an internal reservoir, but must be replaced manually, usually from the front. This was the most common type up until the earlier part of the mid-twentieth century. Most have a mechanism that retracts the lead when twisted the other way, but many older designs do not and the lead must be pushed back into the pencil manually.

A clutch pencil (or leadholder) tends to use thicker leads (2.0–5.6 mm) and generally holds only one piece of lead at a time. A typical clutch pencil is activated by pressing the eraser cap on the top, to open the jaws inside the tip and allow the lead to freely drop through from the barrel (or back into it when retracting). Because the lead falls out freely when the jaws are opened, its forward movement cannot be controlled except by external means. This can be easily done by keeping the tip of the pencil a few millimeters above a work surface or the palm of one's hand. Some clutch pencils do have mechanisms which incrementally advance the lead, such as the Alvin Tech-Matic leadholder, but these are not normally considered to be in the same category as most pencils with propelling mechanisms.

Ratchet-based or "repeater" pencils are a variant of the clutch pencil, in which the lead is held in place by two or three small jaws inside a ring at the tip. The jaws are controlled by a button on the end or the side of the pencil. When the button is pushed, the jaws move forward and separate, allowing the lead to advance. When the button is released and the jaws retract, the "lead retainer" (a small rubber device inside the tip) keeps the lead in place, preventing the lead from either falling freely outward or riding back up into the barrel until the jaws recover their grip. Other designs use a precisely fitted metal sleeve to guide and support the lead, and do not need a rubber retainer.

In one type of ratchet-based pencil, shaking the pencil back and forth causes a weight inside the pencil to operate a mechanism in the cap. A button may be present on the top or side of the pencil, to allow the user to advance the lead manually when necessary. Another variation advances the lead automatically. In this design, the lead is advanced by a ratchet but only prevented from going back into the pencil, just held from falling by a small amount of friction. The nib is a spring-loaded collar that, when depressed as the lead is worn away, extends out again when pressure is released.

An advanced ratchet type has a mechanism that rotates the pencil lead 9 degrees counter-clockwise every time the lead is pressed on to the paper (which counts as one stroke), to distribute wear evenly. This auto-rotation mechanism keeps the lead 50% narrower than in the common propelling mechanical pencils, resulting in uniform thickness of the lines written onto the paper. The design was first patented by Schmidt of Germany, and later developed by Mitsubishi Pencil Company of Japan, and named Kuru Toga under the Uni brand. This type of pencil is most suited for Asian languages that have multiple strokes per letter or word, where the pencil is frequently lifted off the paper. The mechanism is less suitable for cursive writing used in western scripts. Another recent auto-rotation movement by Uni rotates the lead 18 degrees per stroke (or 20 strokes per complete revolution), which is better suited for western scripts.

There exist protection mechanisms that prevent the lead from breaking (within certain limits) when excessive pressure is exerted while writing. A mechanism employed in the DelGuard system by Zebra of Japan causes the lead sleeve to extend outward when excessive pressure is applied at an angle. When excess vertical pressure is applied on the lead, the lead is automatically retracted inwards.

Higher-end mechanical pencils often feature a lead hardness grade indicator and sometimes feature a retractable lead guide pipe. This allows the lead guide pipe to retract back into the pencil body, which will keep it protected in storage and during transit and makes it 'pocket-safe'.

== Lead variations ==
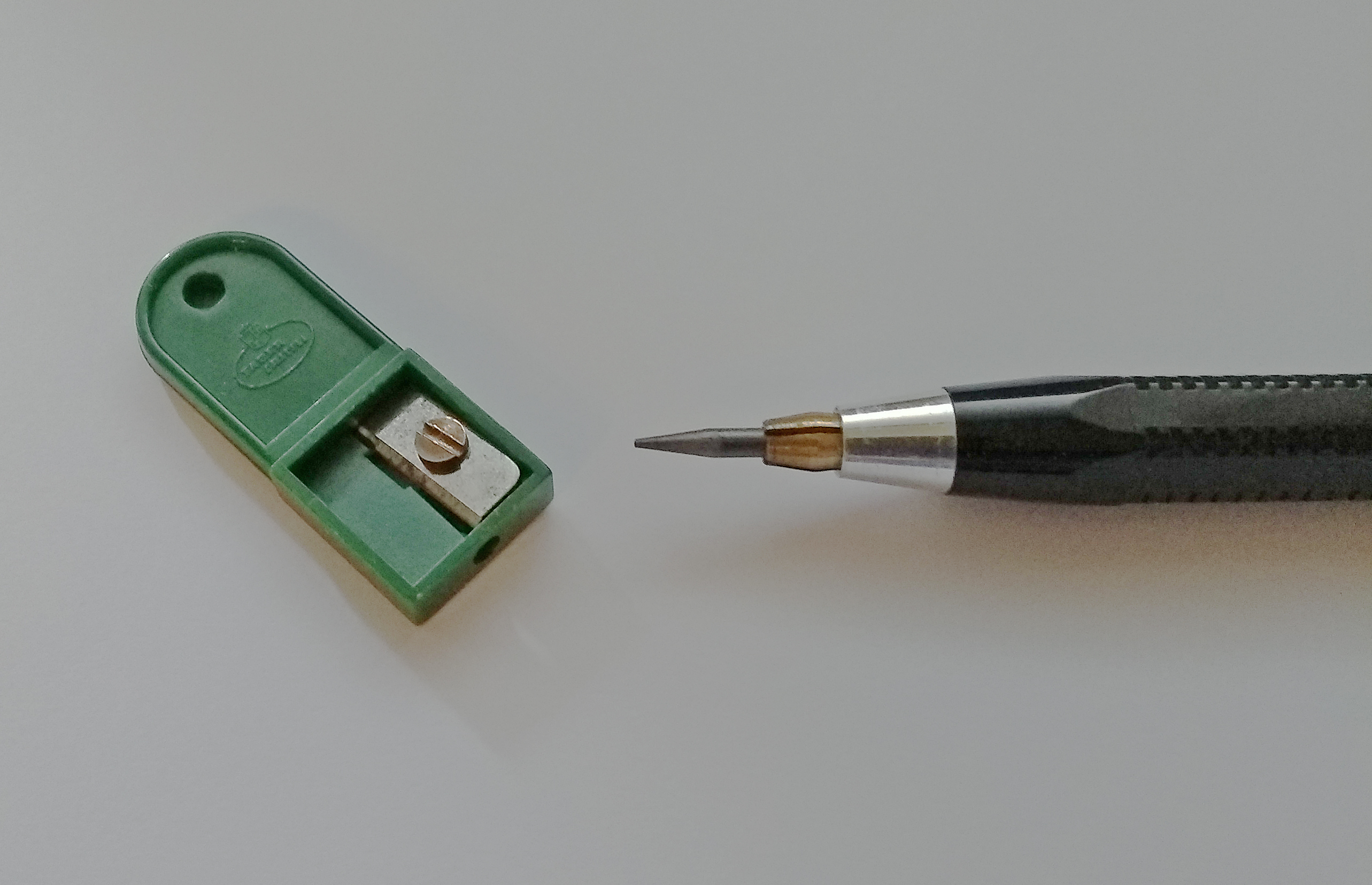
Lead sharpener/pointer and 2mm pencil lead in a clutch-type leadholder.

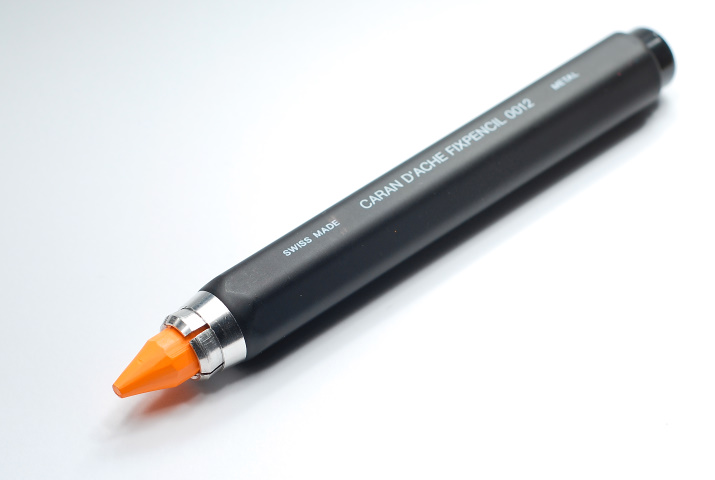
A mechanical crayon holder by Caran d'Ache.

In spite of the name, pencil leads (also called cores) do not contain the toxic chemical element lead, but are typically made with graphite and clay, or plastic polymers. The downside of mechanical leads are that they are not as strong as traditional pencils. Wooden pencil lead is bonded to the outer wooden case, therefore providing more lead protection and strength. This changed in 1962, when Pentel launched new mechanical pencils with the diameters of 0.5mm and 0.7mm. These pencils contained a new type of lead formulated with polymers that act as a binder to strengthen the lead. This polymer replaced the clay in mechanical pencil lead and made it easier for manufacturers to produce lead with smaller diameters.

Compared to standard pencils, mechanical pencils have a smaller range of marking types, though numerous variations exist. Most mechanical pencils can be refilled, but some inexpensive models are meant to be disposable and are discarded when empty.

=== Diameter ===
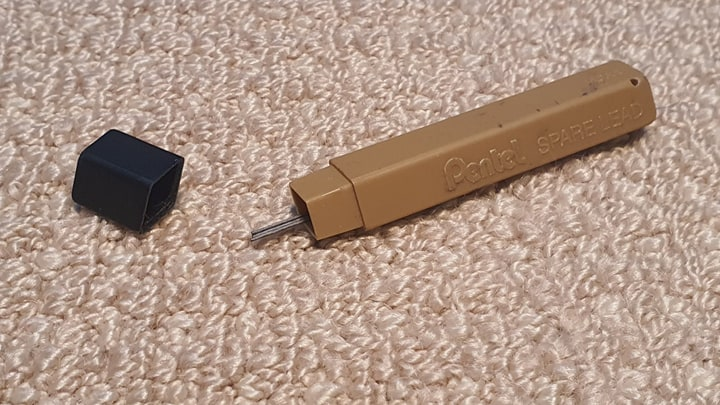
Container for storing a mechanical pencil's lead.

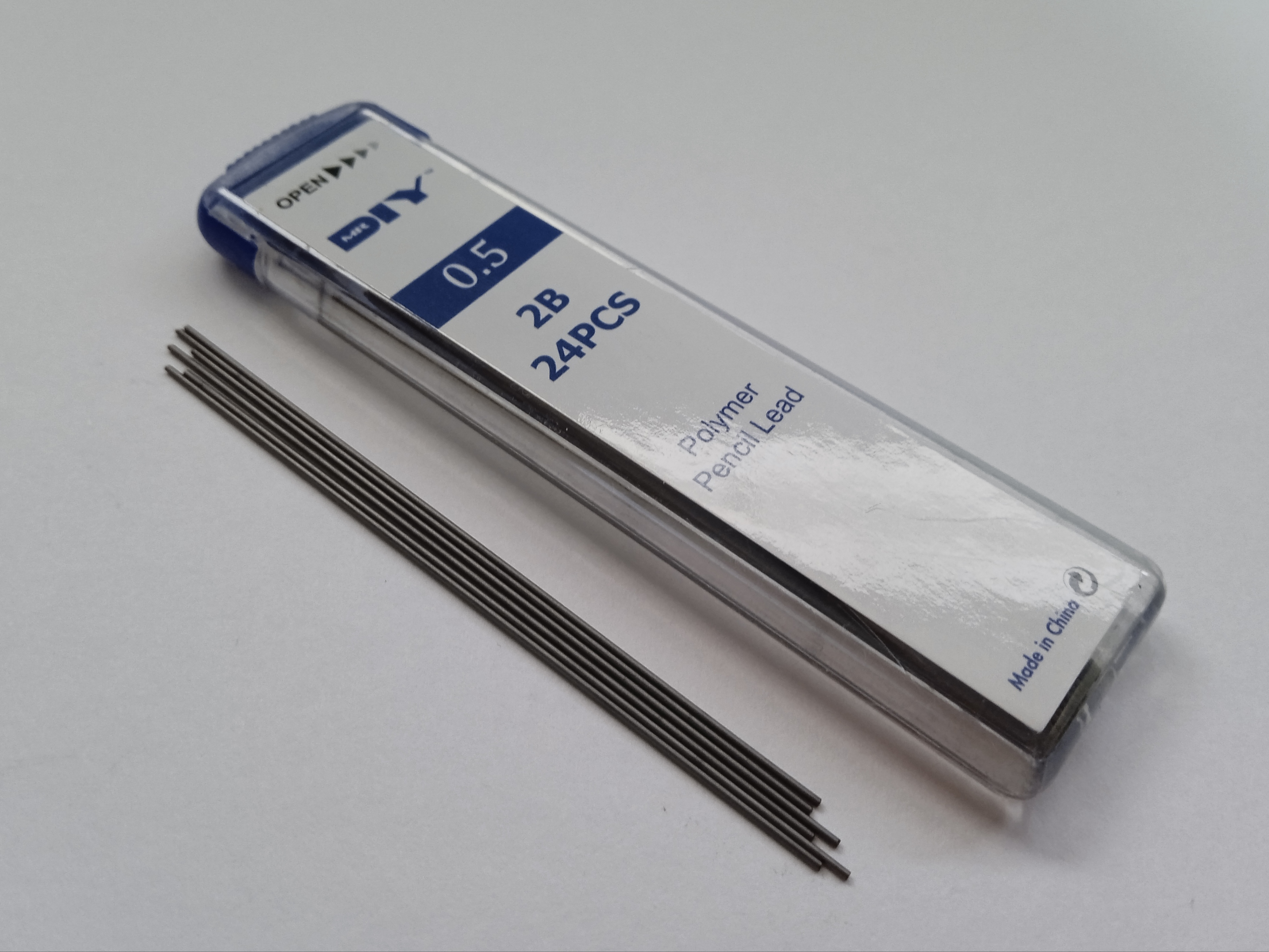
Polymer pencil leads with 0.5mm diameter.

Mechanical pencil mechanisms use only a single lead diameter. Some pencils, such as the Pentel Function 357, place several mechanisms within the same housing, so as to offer a range of thicknesses (in this case three: 0.3, 0.5 and 0.7 mm). 1.00 mm leads also exist, but they are very rare.

Different sizes of lead diameters are available to accommodate various preferences and pencil builds, as shown in the table below. The most common lead sizes are 0.5 mm and 0.7 mm, whose line widths provide a favourable balance between precision and strength. Less common lead sizes can range from 0.2 mm up to 5.6 mm. Pentel has also previously demonstrated a prototype 0.1 mm pencil.

Pencils with sub-millimeter leads can usually hold multiple leads at the same time, reducing the frequency of refills. One exception was the Pentel 350 E, possibly Pentel's first mechanical pencil, which could only hold a single stick of 0.5 mm lead. Refill leads can be bought in small tubes and inserted into the barrel as needed.

| Diameter (mm) | Diameter (in) | Uses |
|---|---|---|
| 0.20 | (0.008) | technical work |
| 0.30 | 0.012 | technical work (also known as 0.35 mm in certain German manufacturers) |
| 0.40 | (0.016) | technical work (only available in Japan & S.Korea) |
| 0.50 | 0.02 | general writing, general technical work, beginner's technical work |
| 0.60 | (0.024) | general writing (only available in Japan, discontinued by Tombow) |
| 0.70 | 0.028 | general writing |
| 0.80 | (0.031) | general writing |
| 0.90 | 0.036 | students/general writing (sometimes labeled as 1.0 mm by certain German manufacturers) |
| 1.00 | 0.040 | rare, used in early Parker repeater cartridge inserts for ballpoints |
| 1.18 | 3/64 or 0.046 | older, used in pencils like the Yard-O-Led; a nominal size, same as 1.1 and 1.2 |
| 1.30 | (0.051) | Staedtler and Pentel (colour leads only for Pentel) |
| 1.40 | (0.055) | Faber-Castell e-Motion and the new Lamy ABC as well as some Stabilo children's pencils |
| 2.00 | 0.075 or 0.078 | drafting and artist's clutch pencils |
| 2.80 | approximately 0.112 | carpentry clutch pencils |
| 3.15 | 1/8 (0.138) | artist's clutch pencils |
| 5.60 | 7/32 (0.220) | artist's clutch pencils |

The bracketed values in inches were found by calculation and rounded to 3 decimal places.

The diameters, however, are not exact. The exact diameter is usually slightly larger. The Japanese JIS standard for mechanical pencil leads, states that the actual diameter for "0.5 mm" lead (for example), should range from 0.55 mm to 0.58 mm.

=== Length ===
For sub-millimeter diameter leads, the standard length of the cylindrical stick for all grades is 60 mm. However, some manufacturers make leads that are 75 mm long, for selected grades.

=== Hardness ===
As with non-mechanical pencils, the leads of mechanical pencils are available in a range of hardness ratings, depending on the user's desired balance between darkness and durability. A commonly used mechanical pencil lead is identical in density, but not in thickness to a traditional HB (US#2) pencil lead. The hardness depends on the proportion of polymer or resin and graphite in the lead. It is determined by a numerical scale: the higher the number, the harder the lead. Similarly to standard wooden pencils, the lead is distinguished by grading scales. H stands for hardness; as they are typically harder and produce a light gray color. B stands for blackness; they produce a darker color and are typically softer. F stands for fine; it is in between H and HB on the lead grading scale. Compared to standard pencils that have 24 grades of lead, there are only 10 grades of mechanical pencil lead, ranging from 4H-4B.

=== Pigments ===
Mechanical pencils with colored leads are less common, but do exist. Crayola's "Twistable" product line includes two different types of colored pencils (erasable and non-erasable) with mechanical feed mechanisms that are dispensed by twisting, but does not offer refill leads. Several companies such as Pentel, Pilot, and Uni-ball (Mitsubishi Pencil Co.) currently manufacture colored refill leads in a limited range of diameters (0.5 mm, 0.7 mm, or 2.0 mm) for their own products, as well as "variety packs" consisting of different colors of leads for those who want to trial different colors of lead. Koh-i-Noor makes mechanical colored pencils with replaceable leads in 2.0, 3.15 and 5.6 mm sizes.

== See also ==
- Technical drawing tools

== Bibliography ==
- Deborah Crosby, Victorian Pencils: Tools to Jewels, Schiffer Publishing Ltd., Atglen, PA, 1998
- Henry Petroski, The Pencil: A History of Design and Circumstance, New York: Random House, 2010
- Jonathan A. Veley, The Catalogue of American Mechanical Pencils, Greyden Press, 2011
