= Caran d'Ache (company) =

Swiss manufacturer of writing instruments

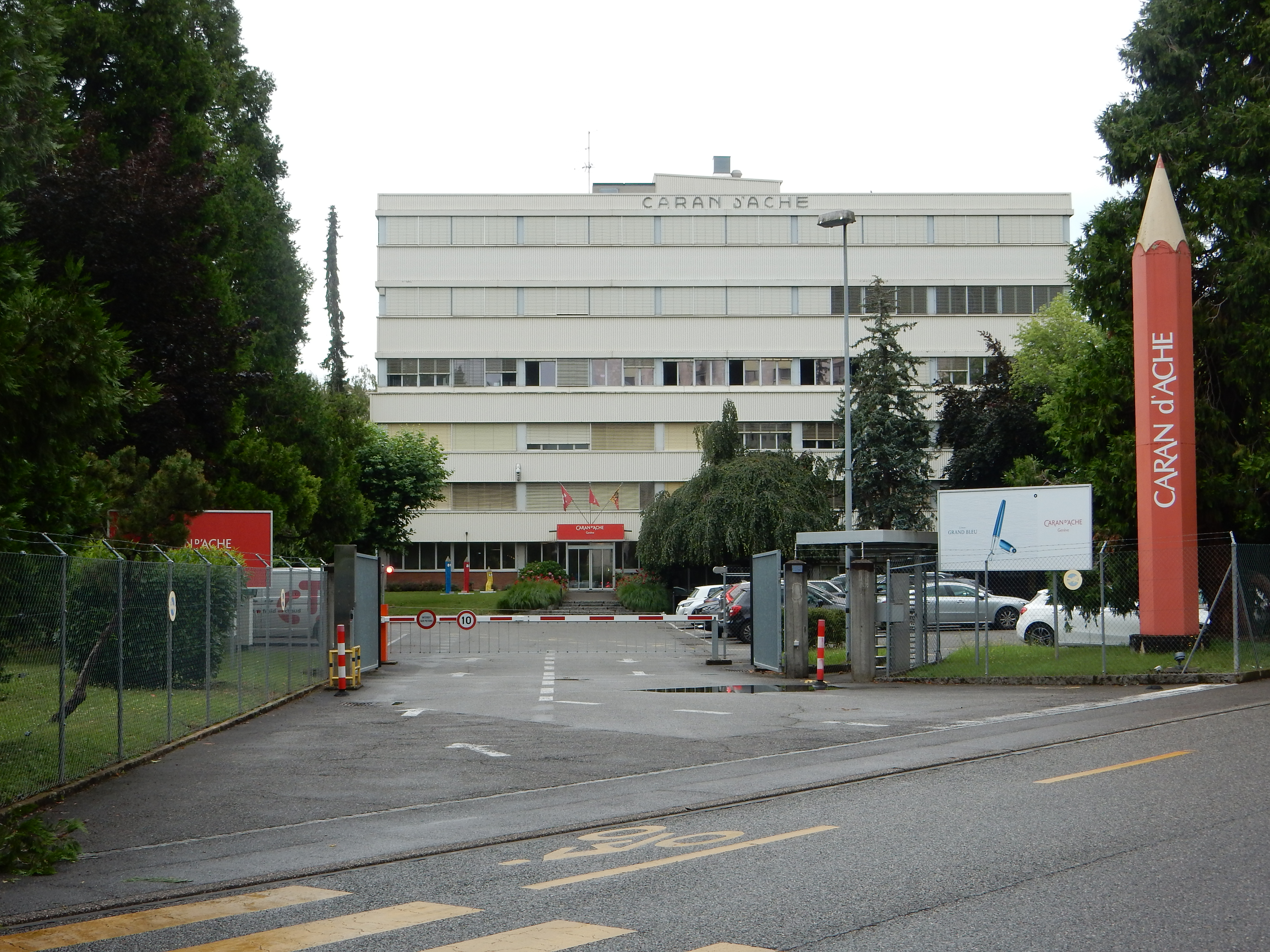
- Caran d'Ache headquarters in 2024
- Formerly: Fabrique Genevoise de Crayons (1915–24)
- Type: Private
- Industry: Art materials Writing instruments
- Founded: 1915; 111 years ago
- Founder: Arnold Schweitzer
- Headquarters: Thônex, Geneva, Switzerland
- Area served: Worldwide
- Key people: Carole Hübscher
- Products: Colored pencils, graphite pencils, pastels, fountain pens, ballpoint pens, mechanical pencils, markers, gouache paints, ink cartridges
- Subsidiaries: Caran d'Ache Canada
- Website: carandache.com

Caran d'Ache (French pronunciation: [kaʁɑ̃ daʃ]) is a Swiss manufacturing company of art materials and writing instruments. The company, established in 1915, produces a wide range of products including colored pencils, graphite pencils, pastels, fountain pens, ballpoint pens, mechanical pencils, markers, gouache paints, and ink cartridges.

== History ==
The company was established as "Fabrique Genevoise de Crayons Ecridor" in Geneva in 1915. When Arnold Schweitzer took over the company in 1924, he renamed it after Caran d'Ache, the pseudonym of the Russian-French satiric political cartoonist Emmanuel Poiré – who in turn took his pseudonym from карандаш (karandash), the Russian word for 'pencil', itself of Turkic origin.

In 1974, the company moved its production center to Thonex, a municipality of the Canton of Geneva. The company is known to include precious diamonds in the pens, and for that, in 1999, the Modernista Diamonds pen was included in the Guinness Book of Records as "the most expensive pen in the world".

In June 2012, the owner Jacques Hübscher handed over the management to his daughter Carole Hübscher.

== Products ==
Some of Caran d'Ache products developed over the years include:

- Technograph, the classic pencil introduced in the 1920s, the most longstanding product to date
- Fixpencil, a mechanical pencil invented by Carl Schmid in 1929.
- Prismalo, the first watercolor pencil in the world, launched in 1931.
- Neocolor (1952), a wax oil pencil, changed in 1972 to make it water-soluble
- Ecridor (1953), originally intended to a be an alternative to the Fixpencil, then added a ballpoint pen to its line to redefine it as a luxury product
- 849 ballpoint pen of 1969, successor of the Ecridor
- Madison, the first fountain pen made by the firm
- 6901 Luminance (2010), a new range of colored pencils

== Gallery ==
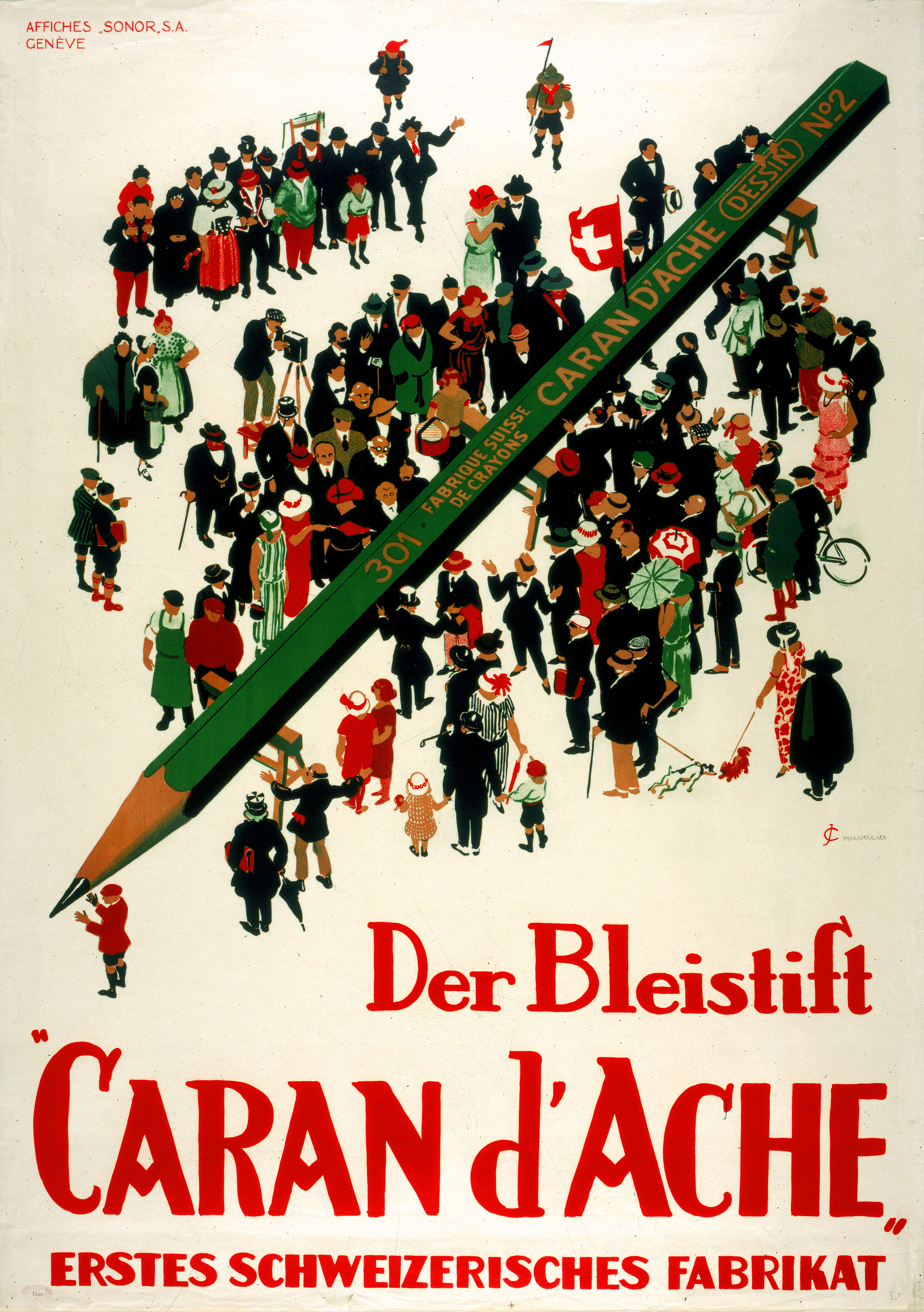
Poster, around 1930

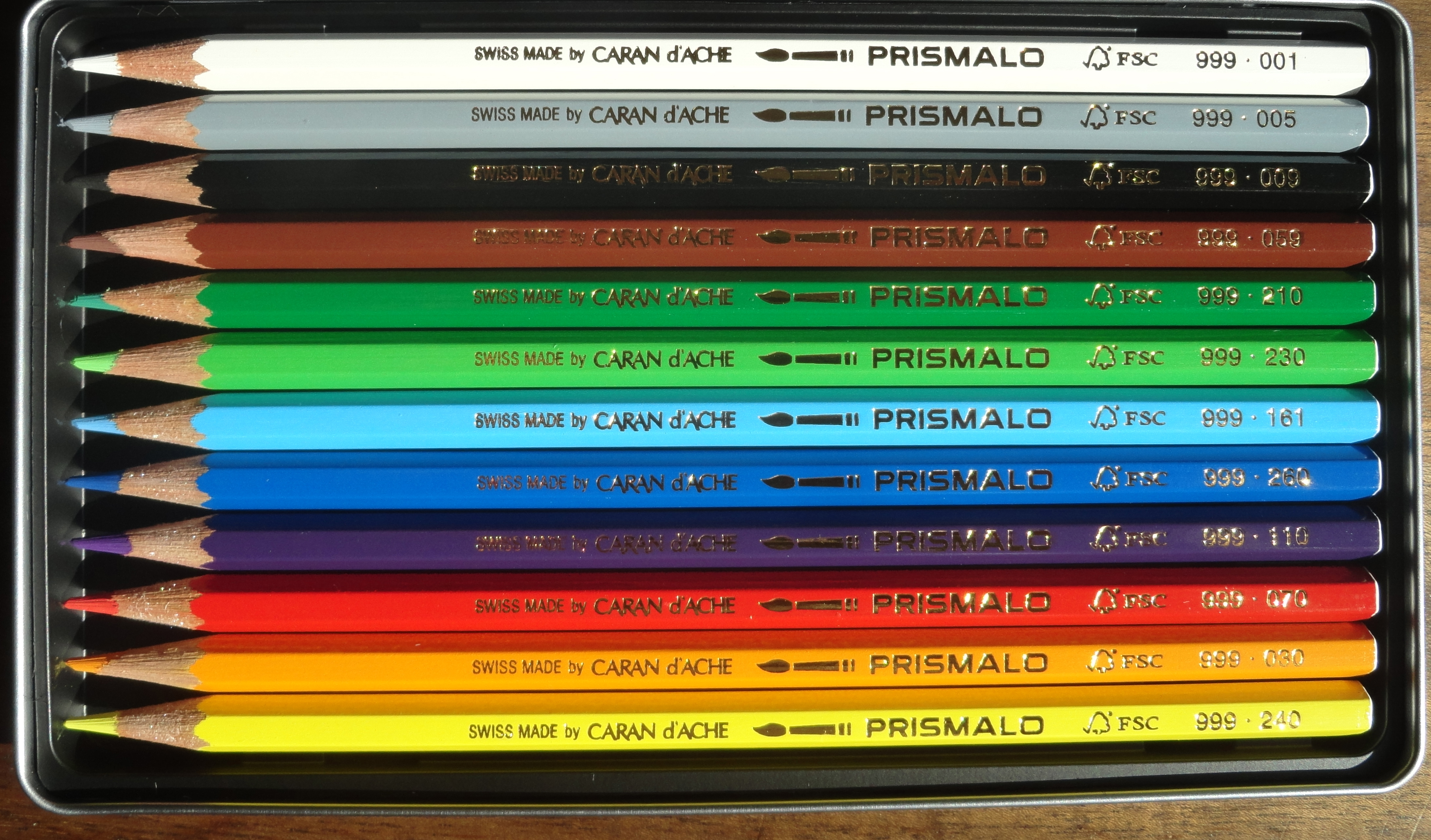
Coloured pencils

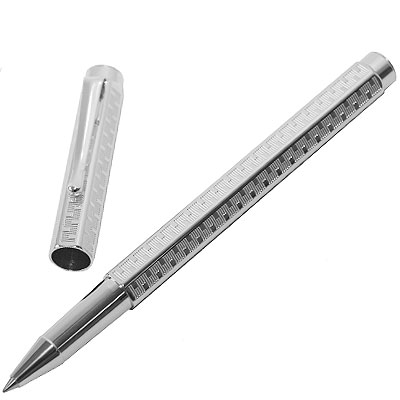
A luxury pen

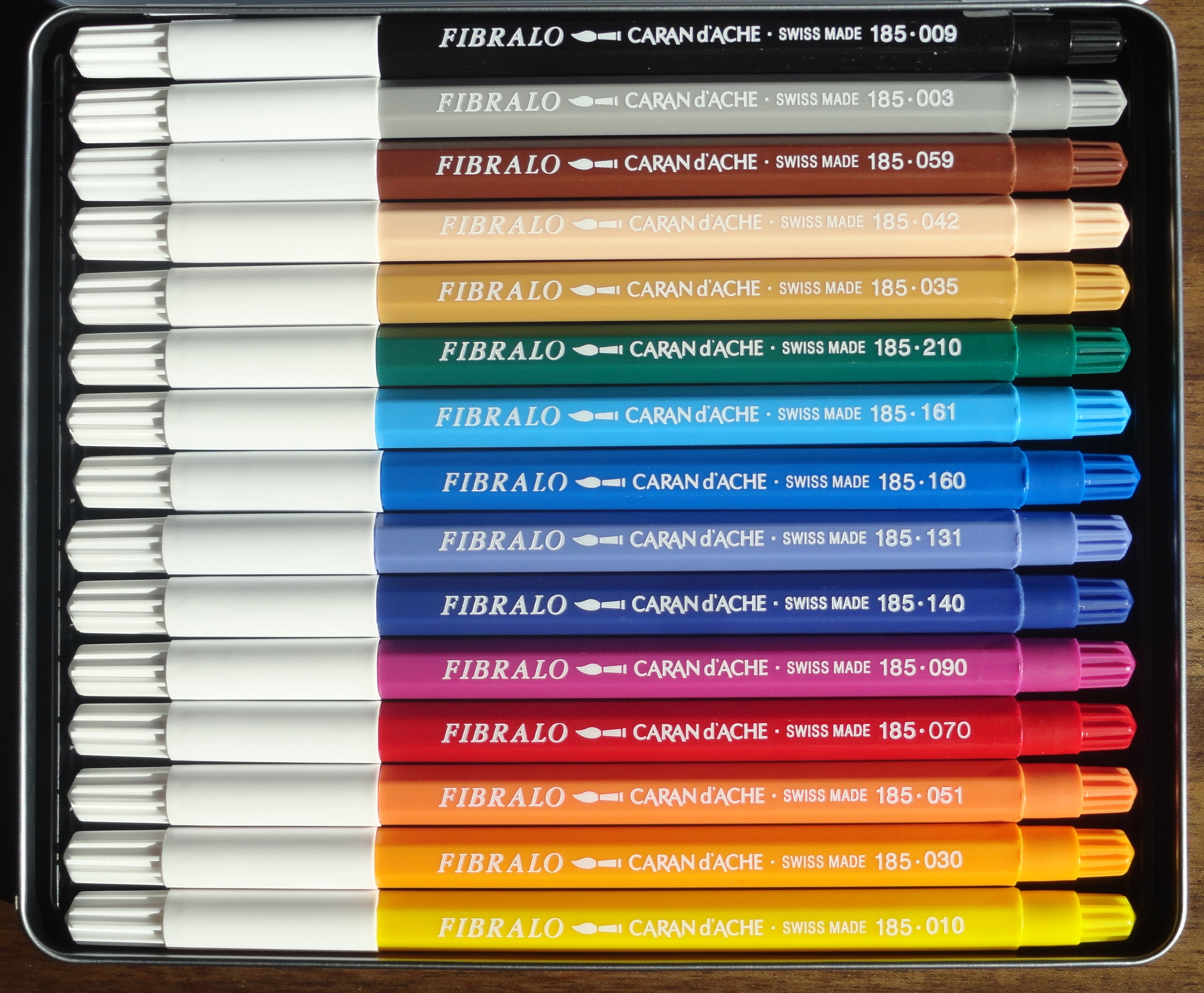
Felt-tip pens

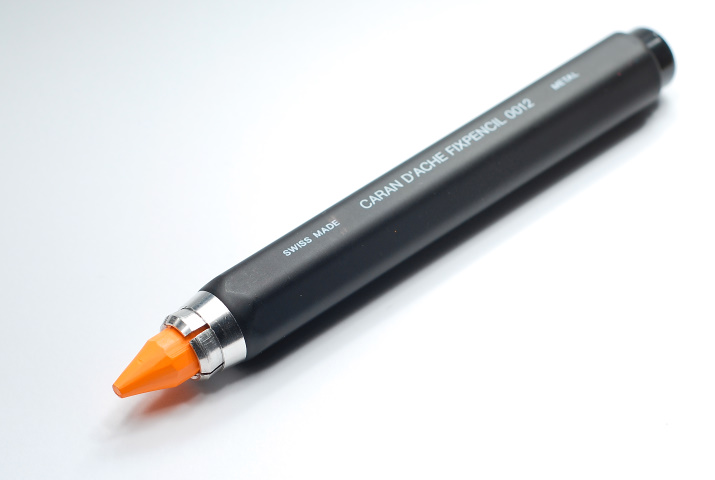
A type of mechanical pencil

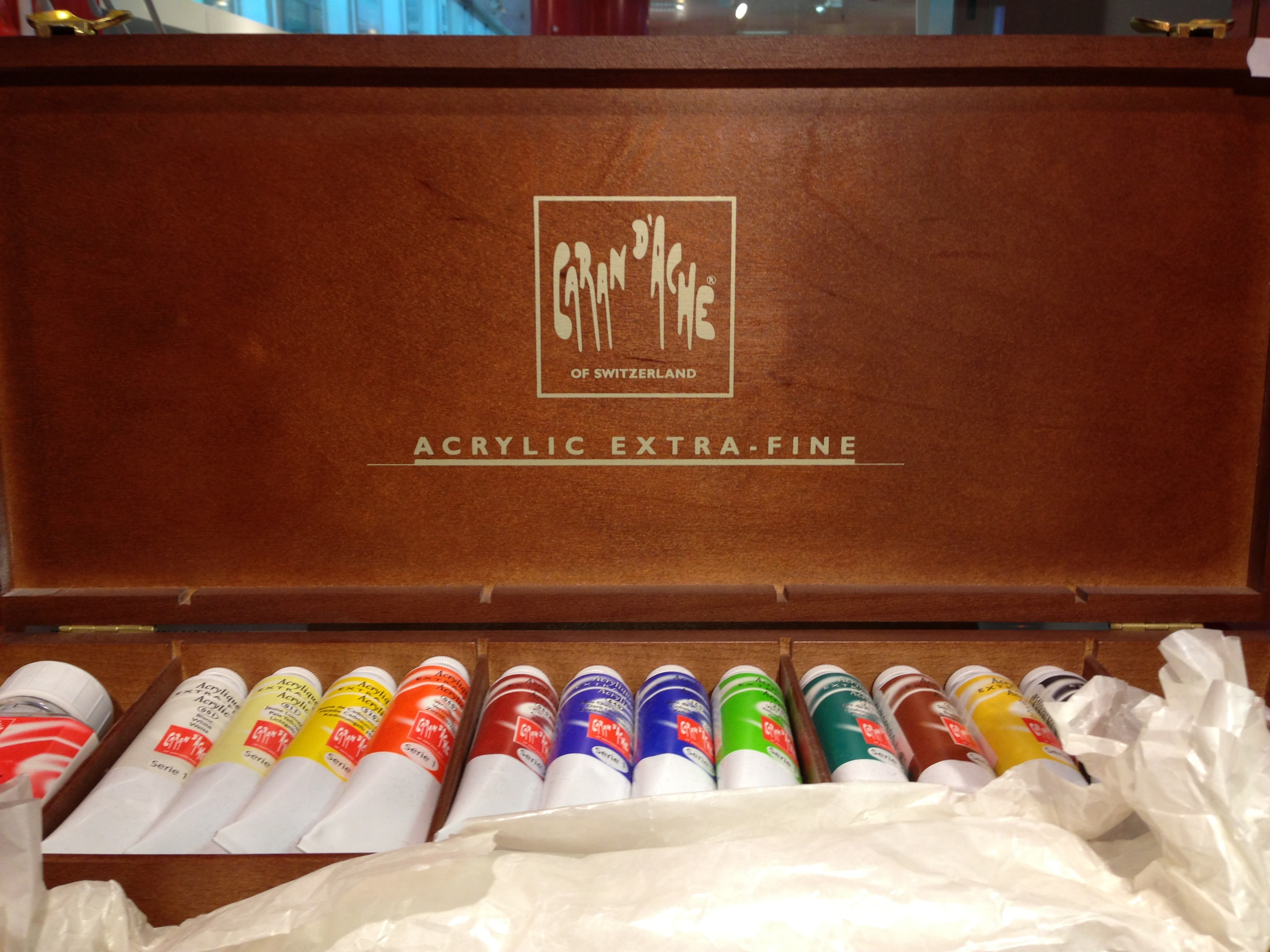
Acrylic paint tubes

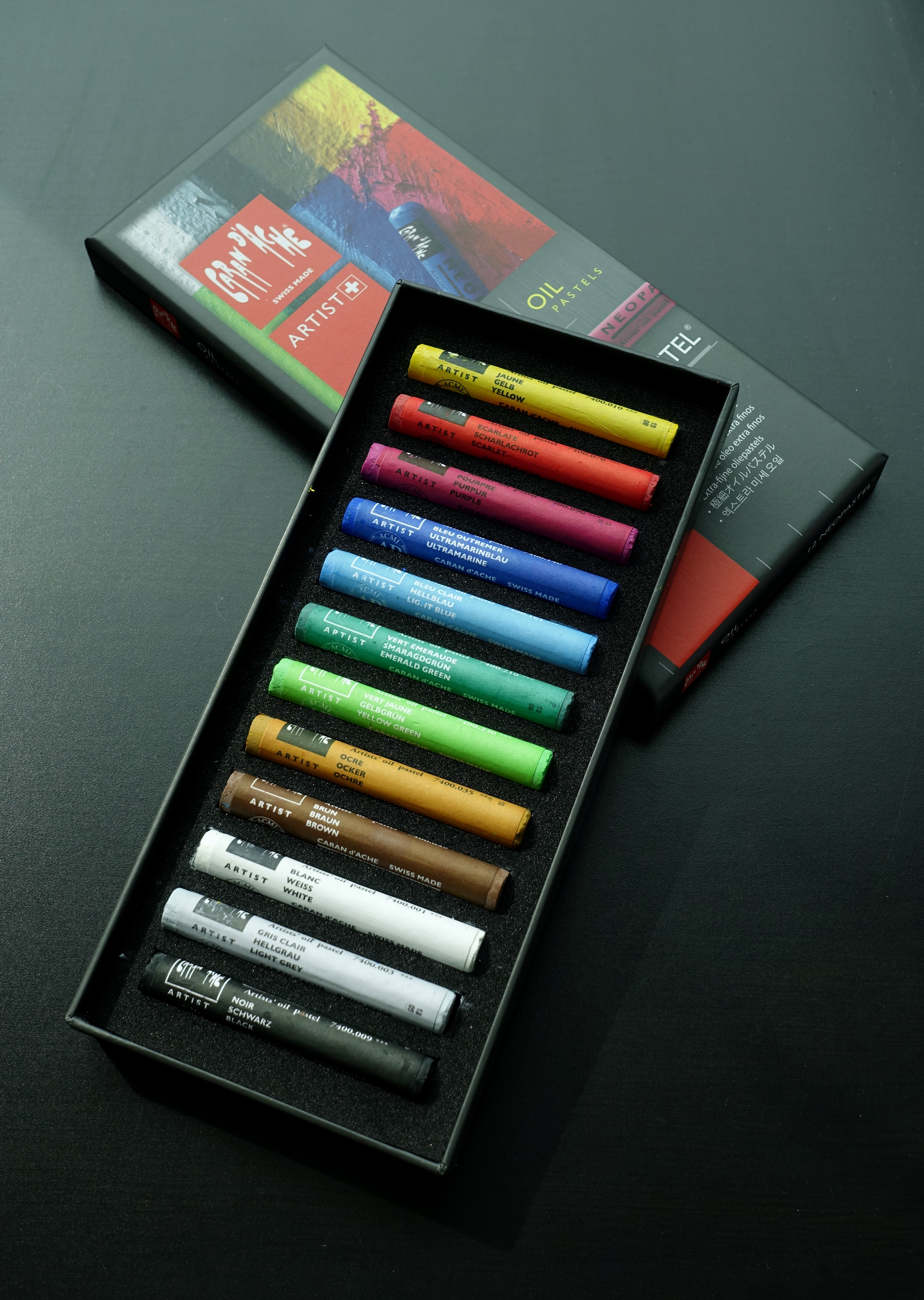
Oil pastels
