= Sampson Mordan =

Co-inventor of the mechanical pencil (1790–1843)

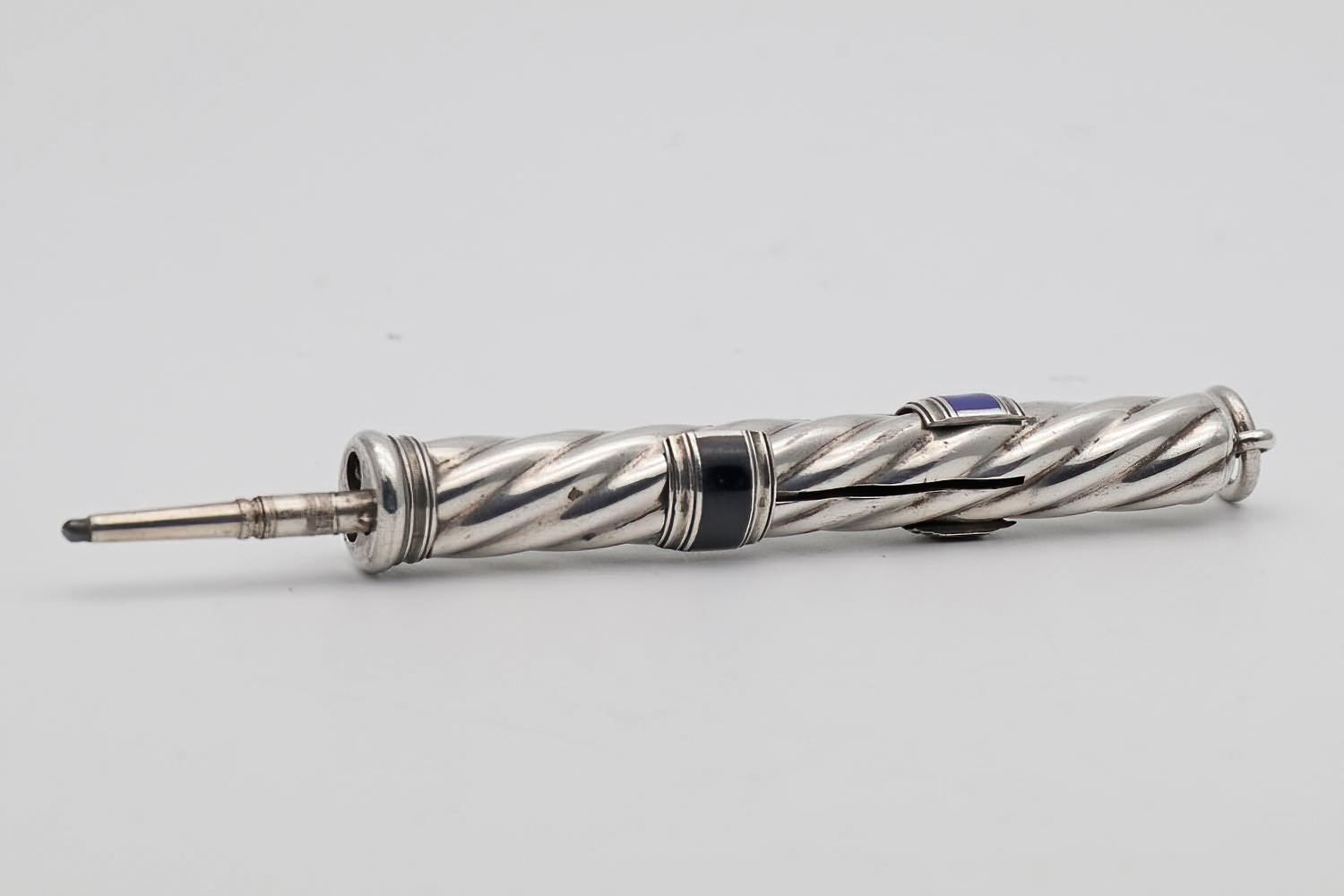
Silver mechanical pencil

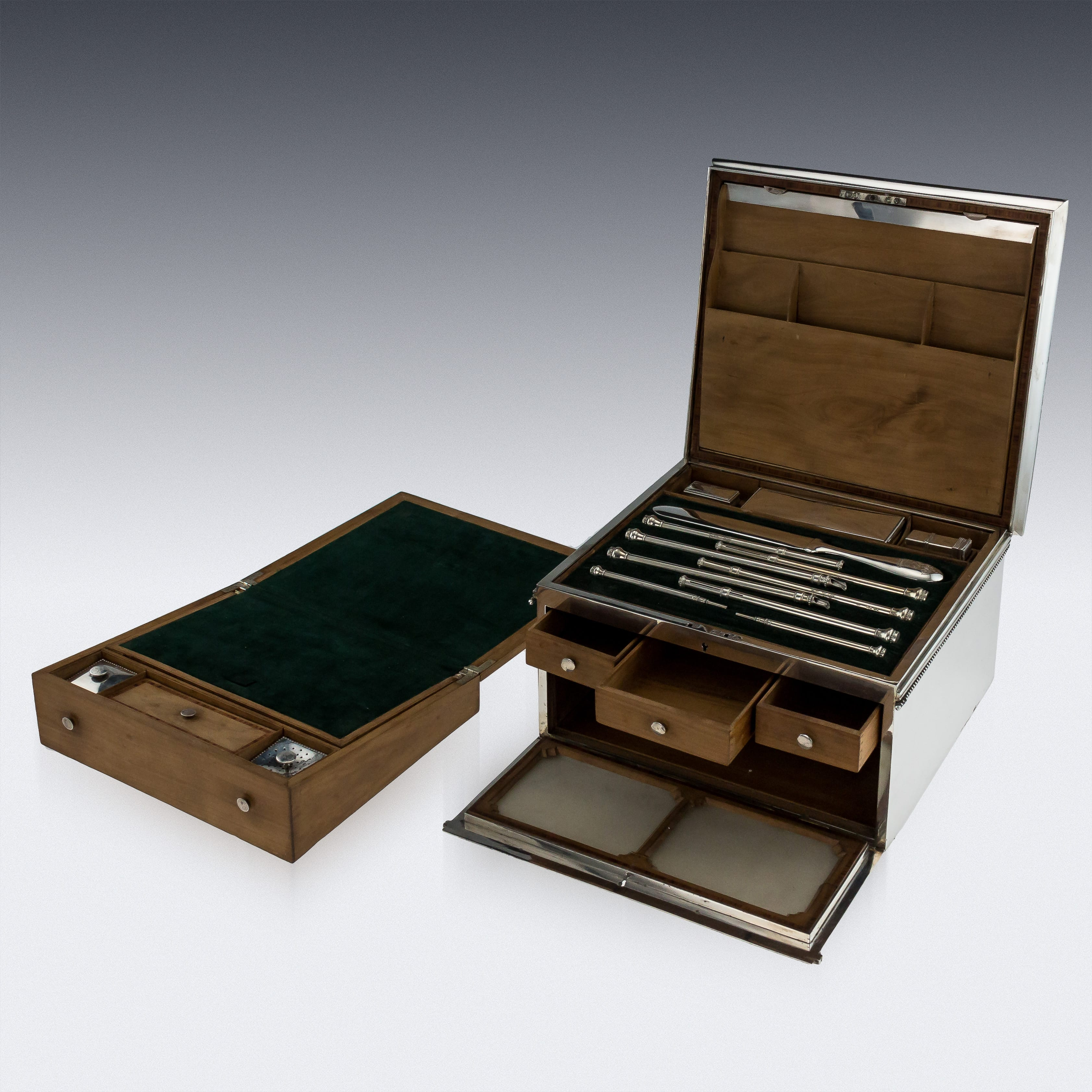
A writing desk set by Sampson Mordan

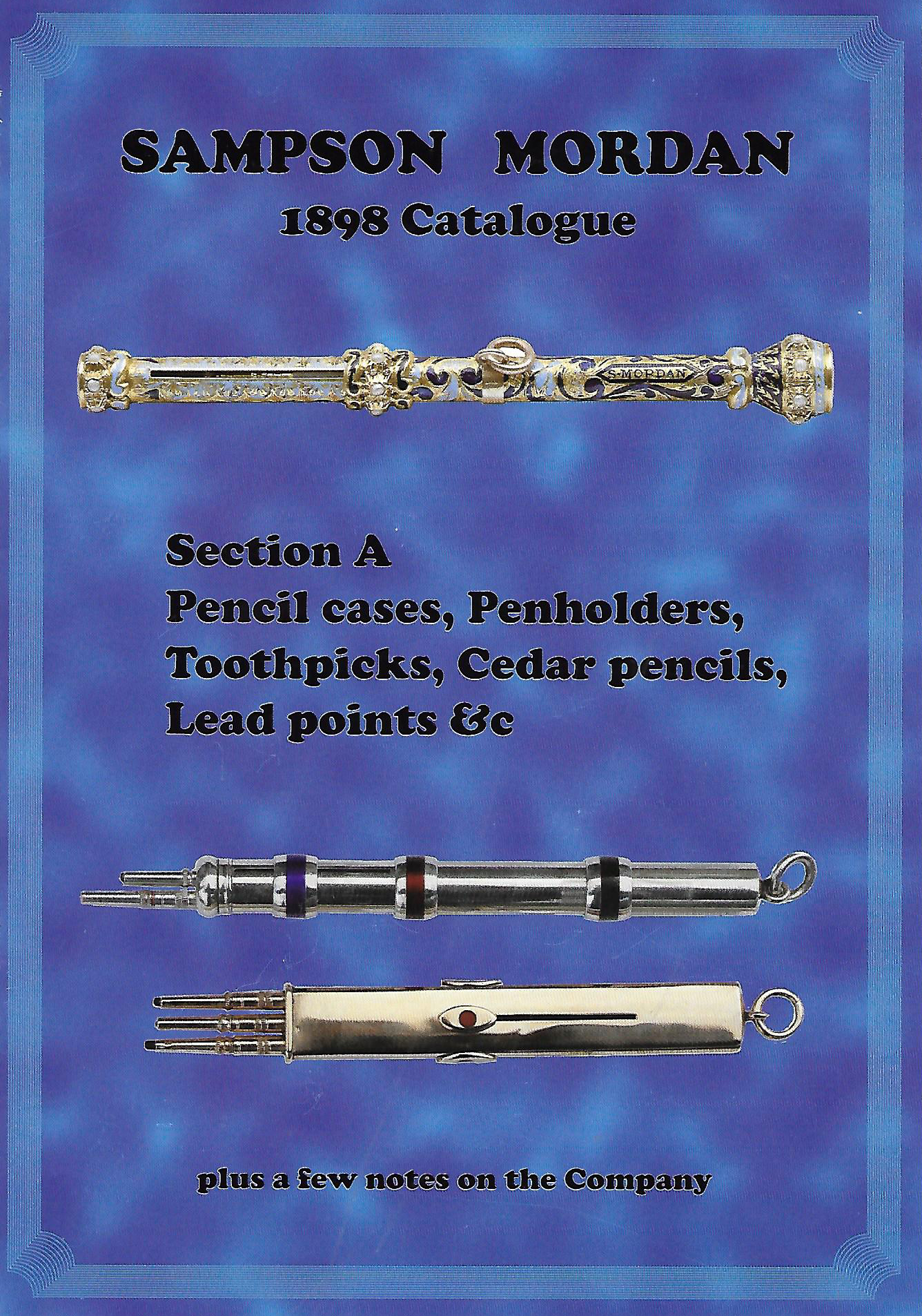
Catalogue from 1898

Sampson Mordan (c. 1790 – 9 April 1843) was a British silversmith and a co-inventor of the first patented mechanical pencil. During his youth, he was an apprentice of the inventor and locksmith Joseph Bramah, who patented the first elastic ink reservoir for a fountain pen.

In 1822, Mordan and his co-inventor John Isaac Hawkins filed the first patent in Great Britain for a metal pencil with an internal mechanism for propelling the graphite "lead" shaft forward during use, as an improvement on the less complex leadholders that merely clutched the pencil lead to hold it into a single position.

Mordan bought out Hawkins and entered into a business partnership with Gabriel Riddle, an established stationer. From 1823 to 1837, they manufactured and sold silver mechanical pencils with the marking "SMGR". After the partnership with Riddle dissolved, Mordan continued to sell his silver pencils as "S. Mordan & Co.", adding many other types of silver and gold items to his product line. Mordan often made his pencils in whimsical "figural" shapes that resembled animals, Egyptian mummies, or other objects; like his other silverware and goldware, these pencils are now highly collectible.

Upon Mordan's death in 1843, his sons Sampson (junior) and Augustus inherited the firm. "S. Mordan & Co." continued to make silverware and brass postal scales until 1941, when their factory was destroyed by bombs during the London Blitz.

== Sampson Mordan hallmarks ==
The hallmarks changed over the years.

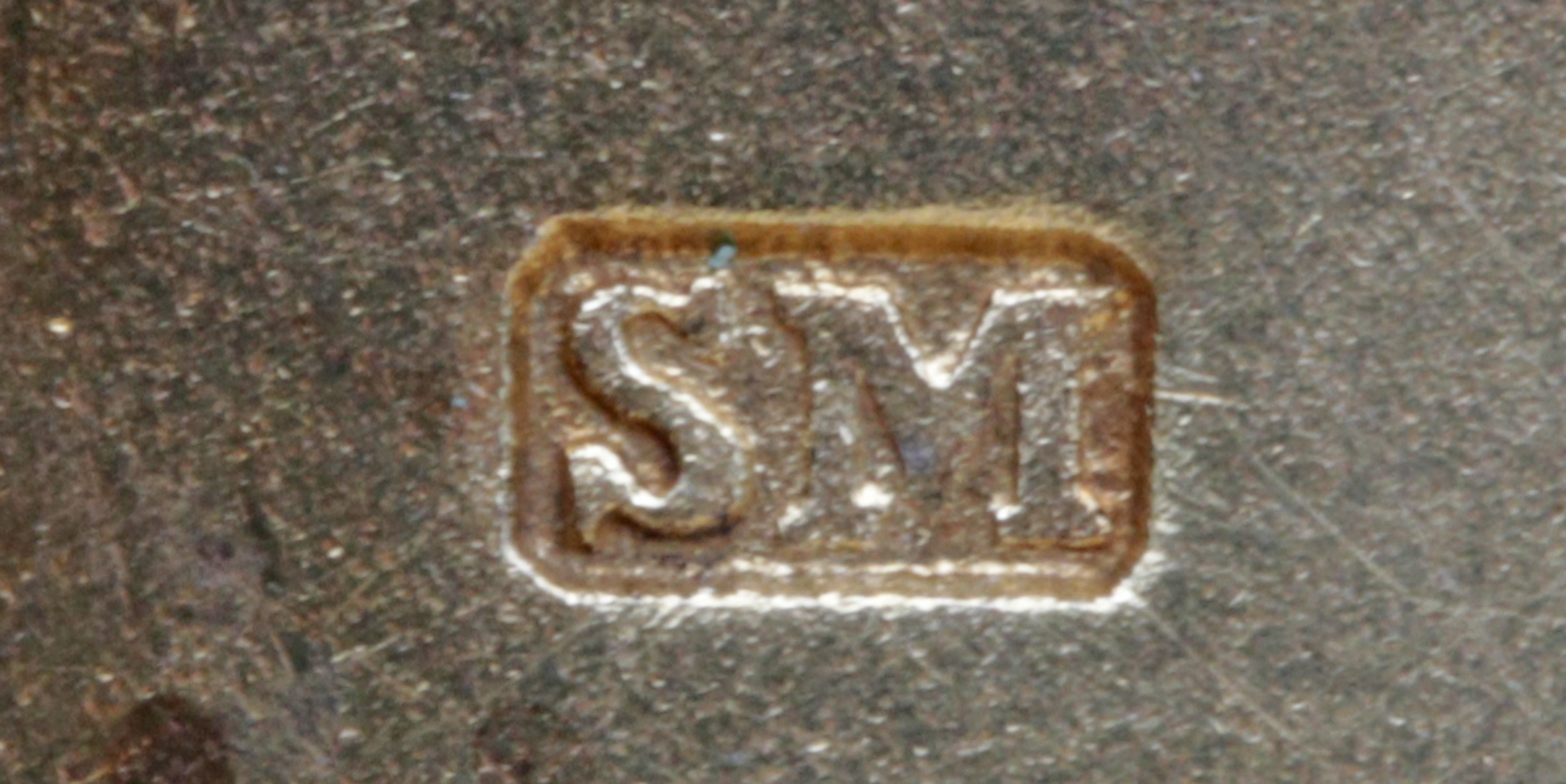
Registered 1823.

Registered 1880.

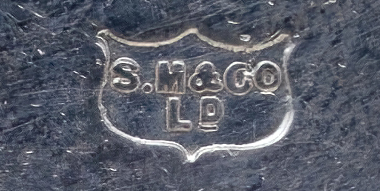
Registered 1889 for use with Chester hallmarked pieces.

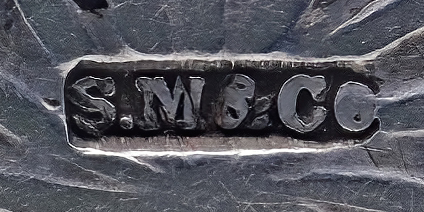
Registered 1890.

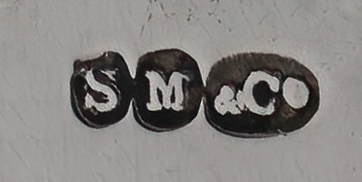
Registered 1904.

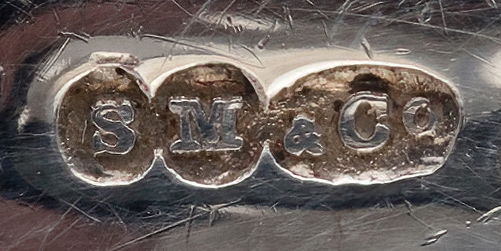
Registered 1906.

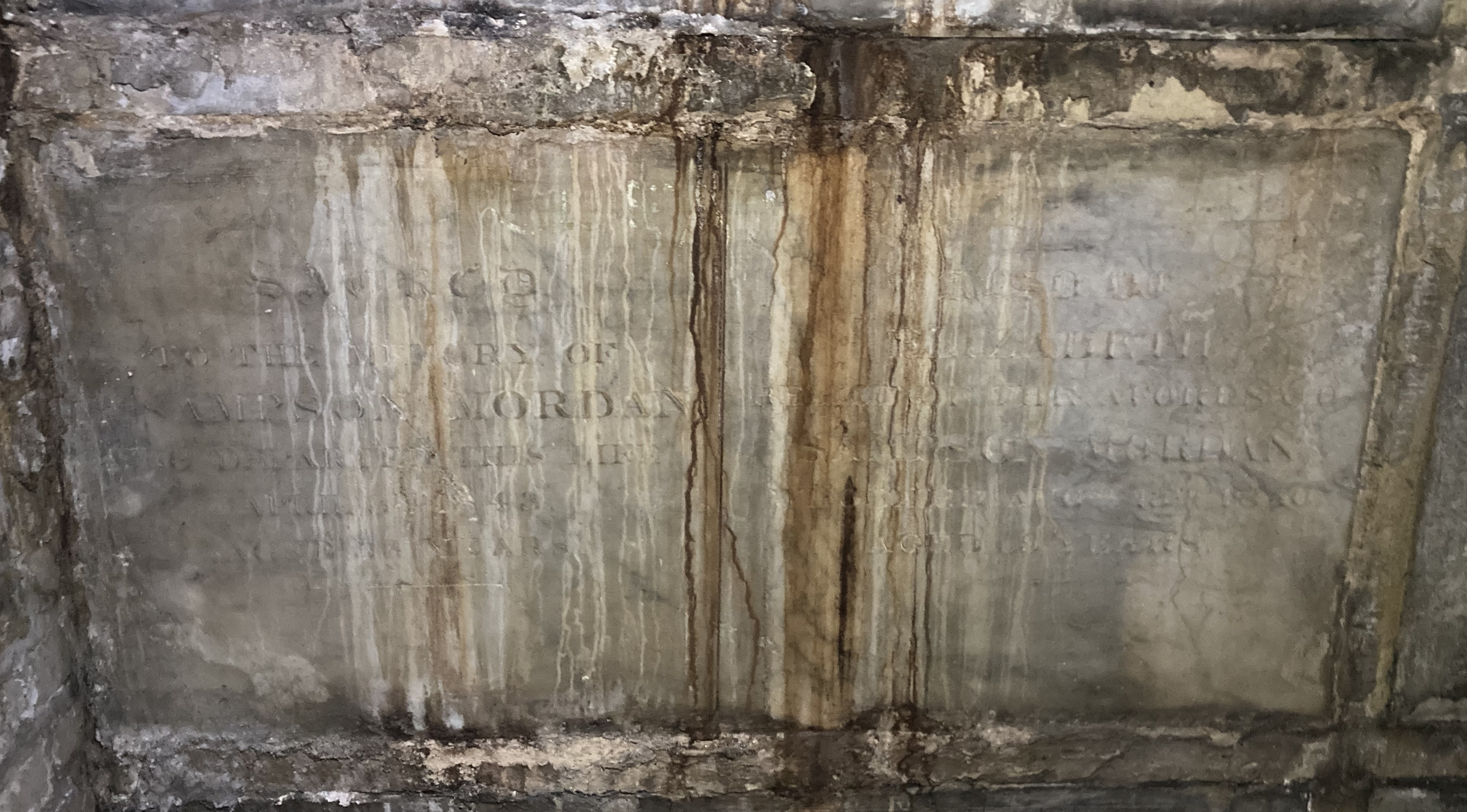
The loculus of Samson Mordan in the Terrace Catacombs of Highgate Cemetery.
