= Zebra (pen manufacturer) =

Japanese manufacturer of writing instruments

Zebra Co., Ltd.

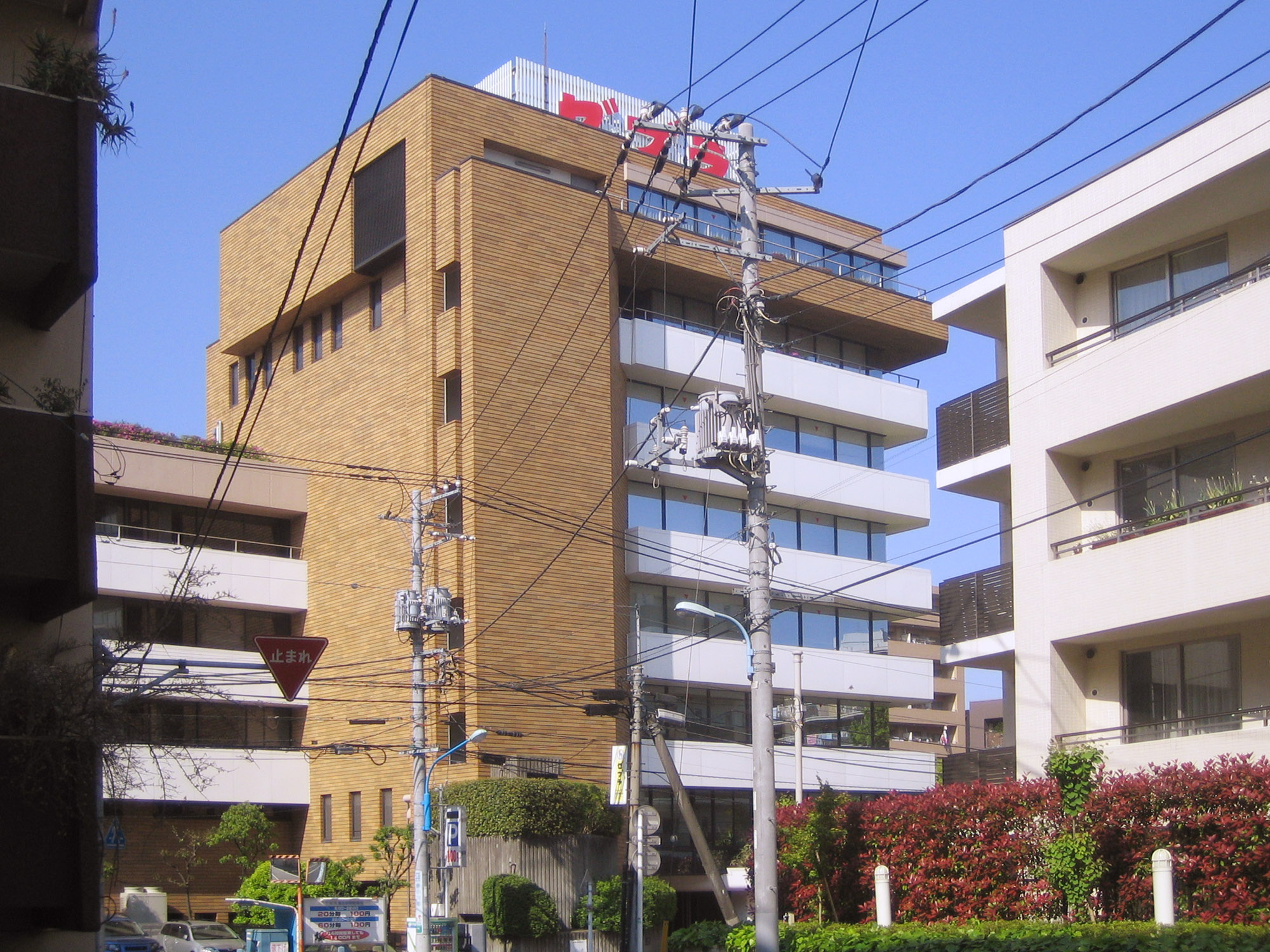
- Zebra head office in Shinjuku, Tokyo, 2006
- Type: Private
- Industry: Writing implements
- Founded: 1914; 112 years ago
- Founder: Tokumatsu Ishikawa
- Headquarters: Shinjuku-ku, Tokyo, Japan
- Key people: Hideaki Ishikawa (President, 1963–98)
- Products: Fountain, ballpoint, brush and gel pens, markers, highlighters, mechanical pencils
- Brands: Sharbo, Steel, Zensations
- Number of employees: 953 (2019)
- Subsidiaries: Zebra Pen Corp (USA); Zebra Pen (Mexico); Zebra Pen Co., Ltd (China); Zebra Pen (UK)
- Website: zebra.co.jp

Zebra Co., Ltd. (ゼブラ株式会社, Zebura Kabushiki gaisha) is a Japanese manufacturer of writing instruments, established in 1914 by Tokumatsu Ishikawa.

The company sells a wide range of writing implements through retail stores, wholesalers and mail order. Zebra offers a line of writing instruments that include fountain, ballpoint, brush and gel pens, markers, highlighters and mechanical pencils.

== History ==
Tokumatsu Ishikawa had begun to produce home-made nibs in 1897, until he established its own business in 1914, registering the name "Zebra" as a trademark. Ishikawa thought Zebra was an appropriate name because his goal was to build a business culture that resembled a family and zebras have a strong herding instinct. Zebra stripes resembling calligraphic pen strokes may also have been a reason for the name.

In 1945, the Zebra facilities were destroyed during a bomb attack in World War II, but those would be reconstructed during the 1950s. In 1959 Zebra launched its first ballpoint pen manufactured. Four years later, the company renamed "Zebra Co., Ltd", with Hideaki Ishikawa becoming president of the firm.

During the 1970s, Zebra marketed its first lines of markers, including brush-tip models, opening a new factory in Tokyo (1979). Zebra opened a subsidiary in the United States (1982). The 1990s and 2000s decade came with new subsidiaries in Canada, Indonesia, China, Mexico, and the United Kingdom.

== Products ==
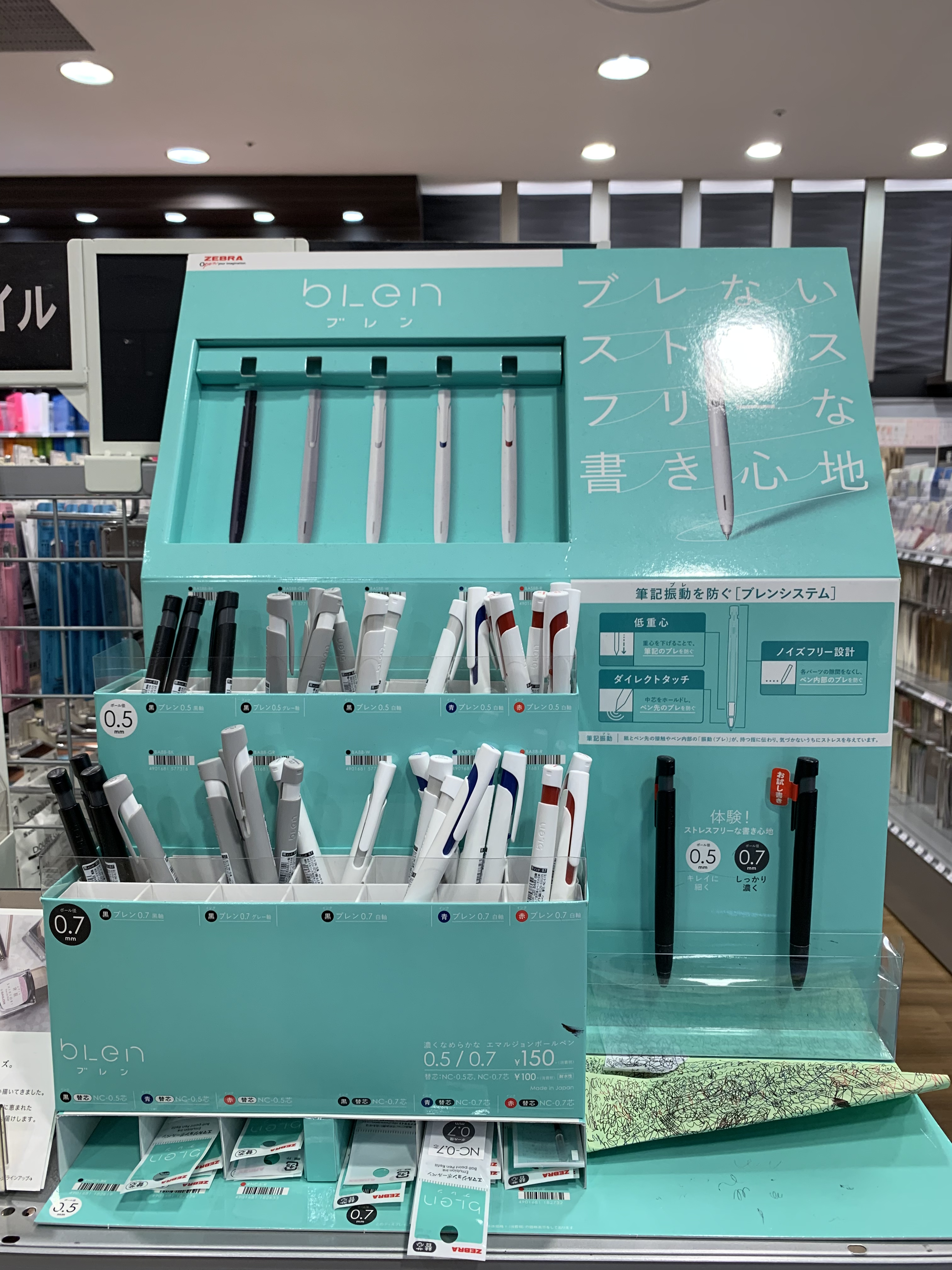
Zebra products exhibited on a booth in Japan, 2019

Zebra's line of pens and pencils include "The Original" F-301 and the M-301, which have stainless steel barrels and textured grips. Other product lines include Blen, Surari, Filare (emulsion ink ballpoint pens); Airfit, Z-Grip (ballpoint pen); Sarasa, Sarasa Dry (gel pens); Sharbo (multi-pens); CLiCKART (water-based coloring markers); DelGuard, Tect 2Way (mechanical pencils); Zensations (art products), Mildliner (double ended creative markers), Hi-Mckee (permanent markers), Zebrite (double ended highlighters), and Zazzle (liquid highlighters). Zebra products are available across the US, Canada, Mexico, UK, Singapore, Korea, and Japan.

=== Z-Grip ===
In 2017, the Z-Grip line of retractable gel pens was transitioned to low viscosity ink, aka advanced ink. The benefits of the new formula, in addition to a smoother writing experience, was more vibrant colors and an option to create more nuanced hues.

=== Steel ===
The Steel line of pens follows a good, better, best hierarchy; 3-series, 4-series, and 7-series respectively. The 301 series is characterized by stainless steel shafts and hardened plastic grips. The 402 has the same stainless steel shaft with a rubber grip. Finally, the flagship pen, the 701 has a knurled grip and is completely stainless steel. A cross section of these barrel styles reflect different ink types. For example, the 3-series barrel is available in ballpoint, gel, mechanical pencil, fountain pen, highlighter, and rollerball pen. All Zebra stainless steel products are refillable, including leads and mechanical pencil erasers.

=== Sarasa ===
The company transitioned all their plastic gel pens from different brands and consolidated under one name, Sarasa.

==== Sarasa Clip ====
These pens feature a binder clip which enables one to secure the pen to pockets, books and so on. The pigment gel ink is water resistant and of archival quality.

==== Sarasa Dry ====
All the former products were reformulated to feature Zebra's award-winning Rapid Dry Ink technology, which was third party laboratory, tested and proven to be as fast or faster drying than the competition on a variety of surfaces and dries in less than a second on most surfaces. The assortment, X1, X10, X20, and X30, reflect different barrel styles to accommodate most consumer preferences.

=== Surari ===
Range of "emulsion-ink" hybrid ink oil-based ballpoint pens, similar to Uni's Jetstream, Pentel's Vicuna and Pilot's Acroball.

=== Zensations ===
Zebra entered the art and activity space with the launch of their Zensations brand of products, geared towards new and amateur artists looking for a slightly higher quality than products solely created for children. The brand encompasses technical pens and pencils, refillable colored mechanical pencils, fineliner markers, calligraphy pens, brush pens (black and colors), and more. Line extensions are developed periodically to refresh the line.

=== DelGuard ===
A mechanism employed in the DelGuard system developed by Zebra, causes the lead sleeve in a mechanical pencil to extend outward when excessive pressure is applied at an angle. When excess vertical pressure is applied on the lead, the lead is automatically retracted inwards. Thus, the lead is protected (within certain limits) in both cases. In Japan, 0.3 and 0.7 versions of the DelGuard is available alongside the 0.5 version, whereas in the US, only the 0.5 version is available.

=== Sharbo ===
Sharbo is a line of multifunction pens. The name is a combination of the Japanese words, "shāpu" (mechanical pencil) and "bōrupen" (ballpoint pen). A pen may contain one or more ink refills plus a mechanical pencil component. Examples are Sharbo X and SharboNu.

=== Zebra Mildliners ===
Newly released highlighters that come in a variety of pastel colours. These highlighters have two ends, one for highlighting and the other also acts as a brush pen which could be used for calligraphy headings/topics for making notes aesthetic and neat.

Zebra products
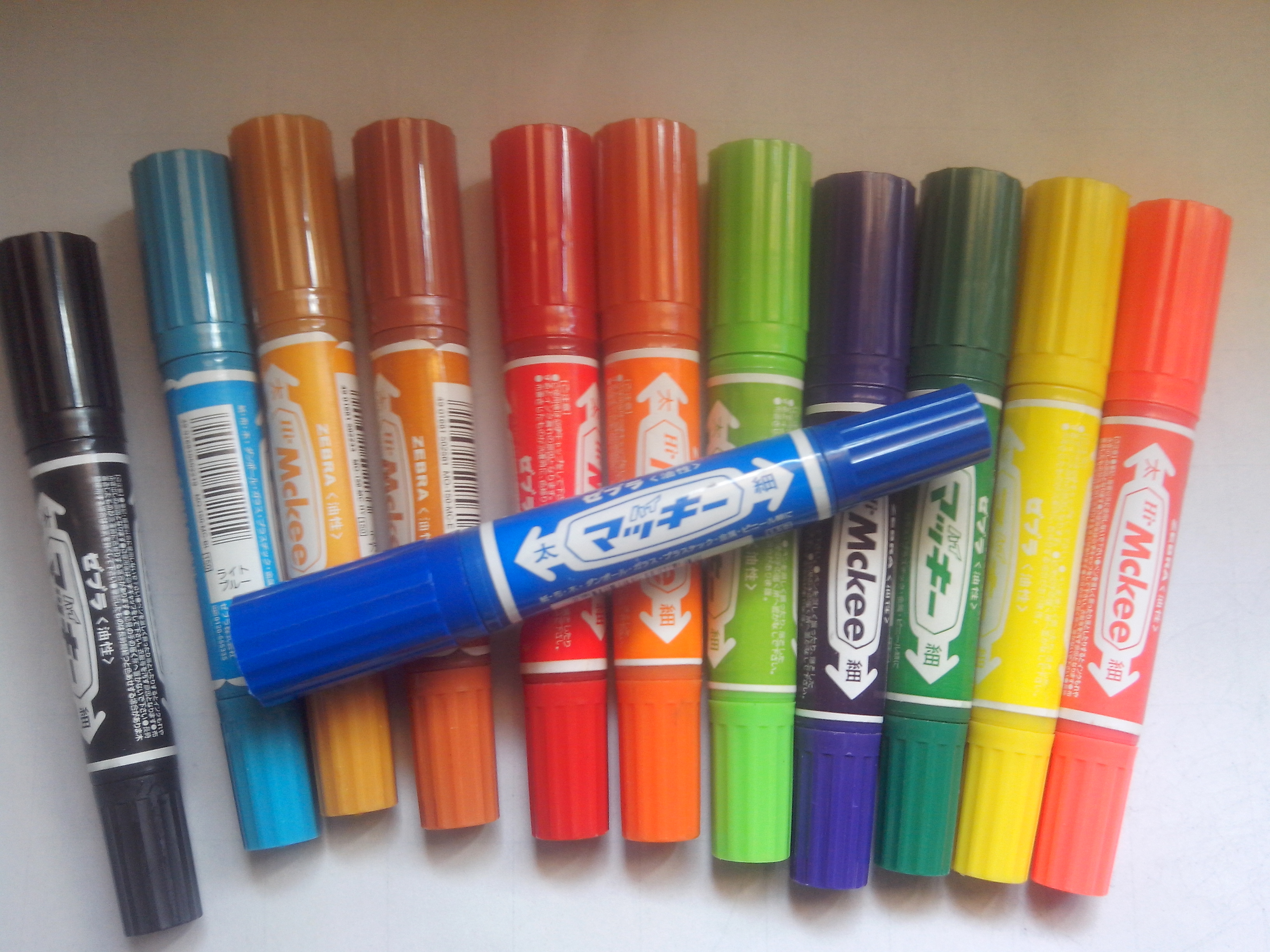
Hi-Mckee markers

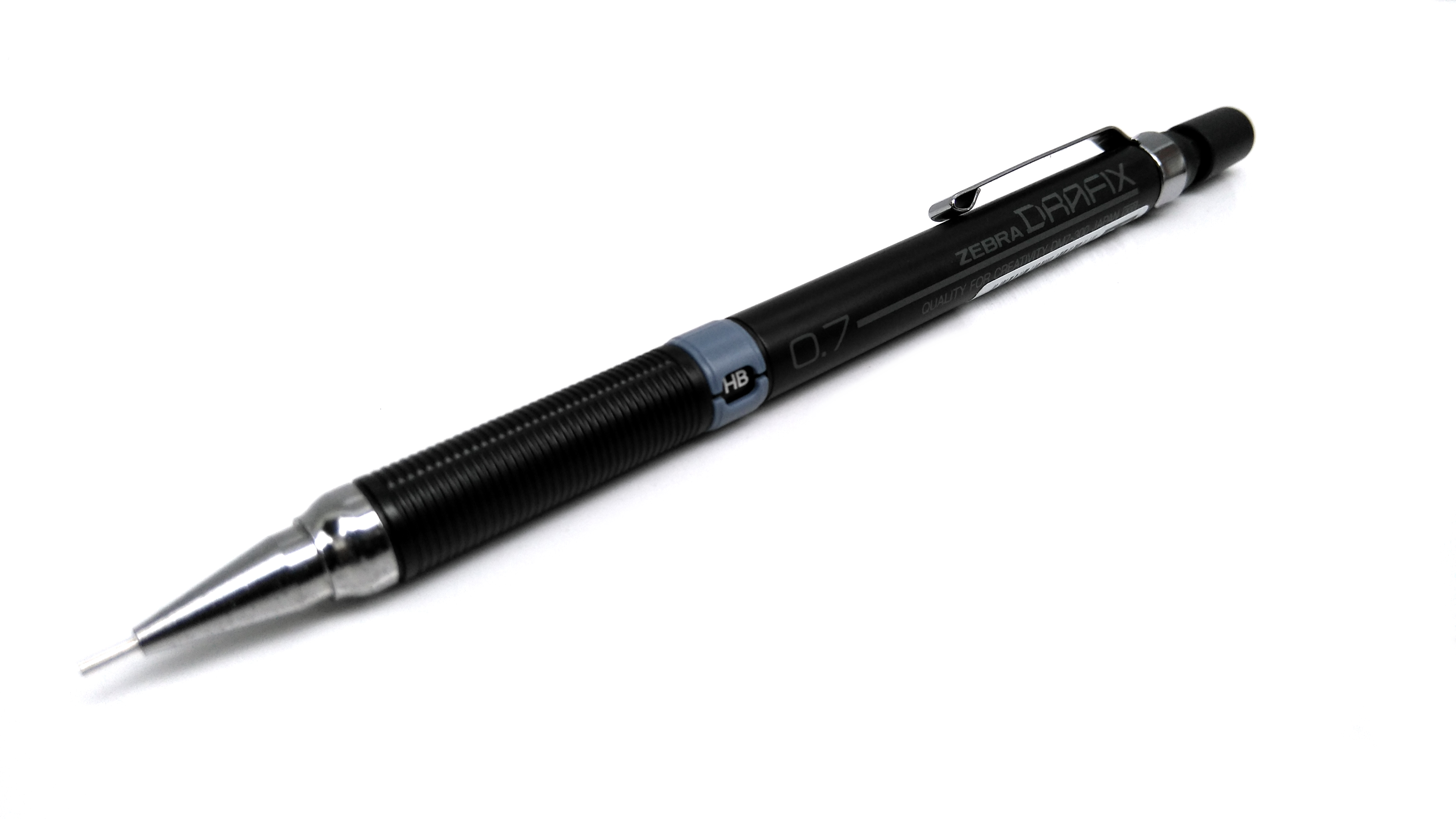
Drafix mechanical pencil

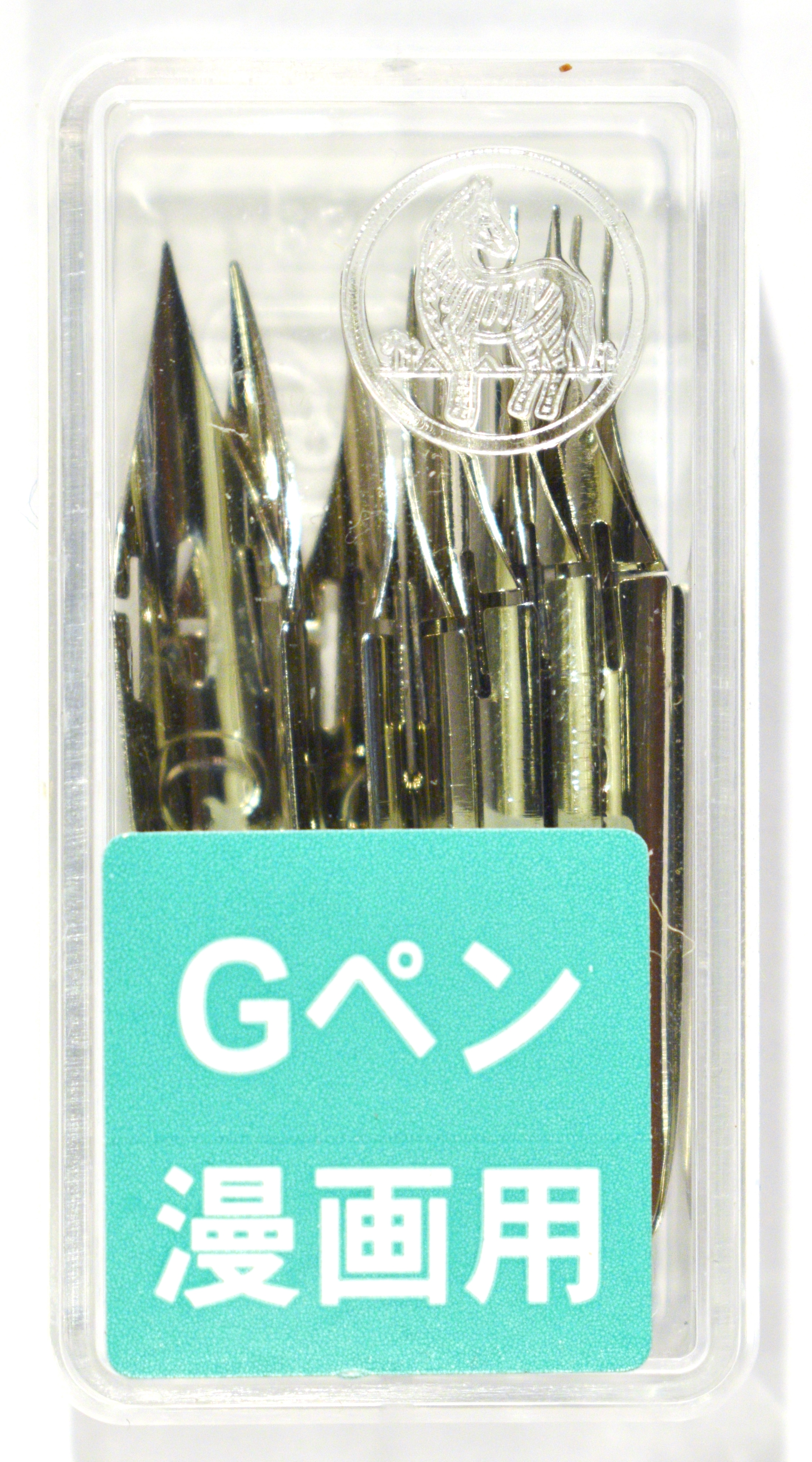
G dip pens box

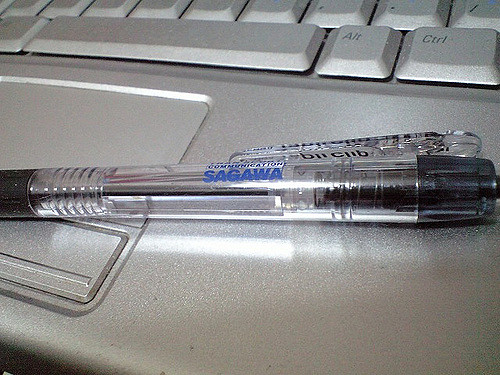
Sagawa ballpoint pen

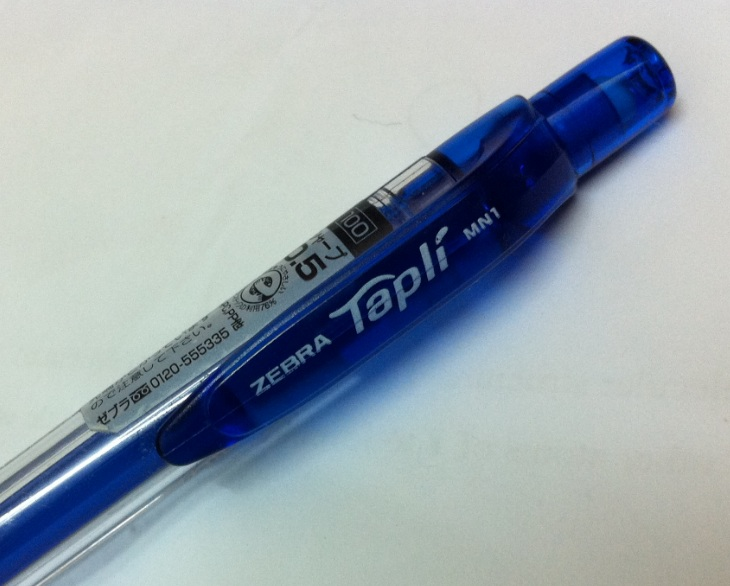
Taplí ballpoint pen

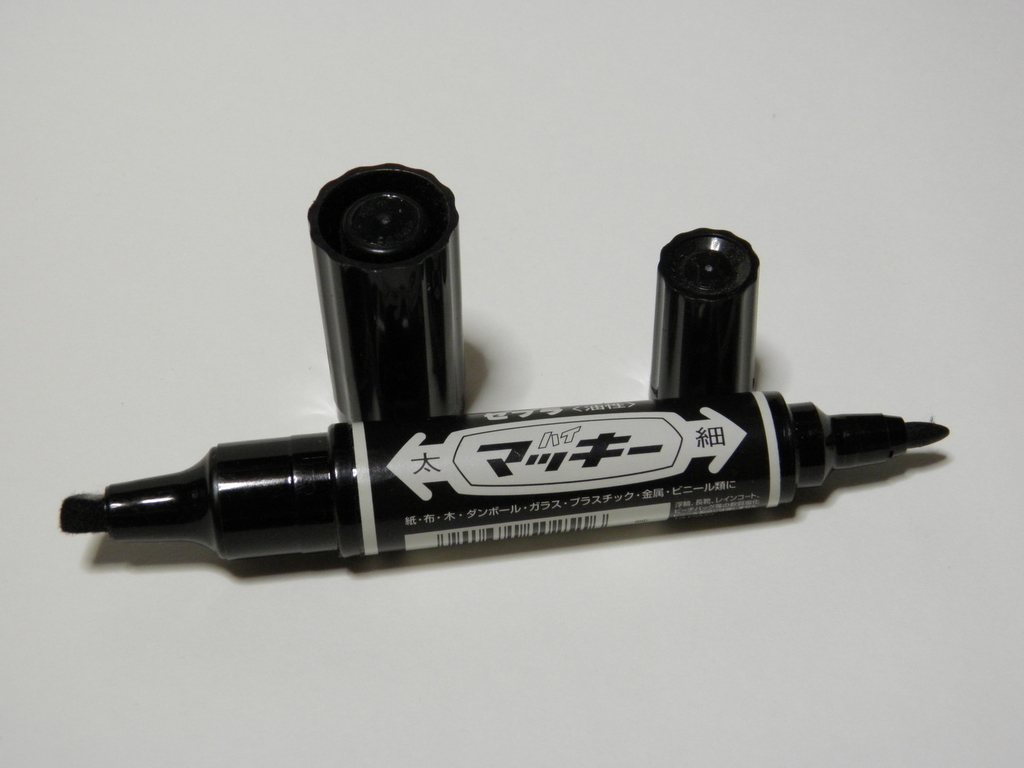
Hi-Mckee two-tip brushes
