= Tombow =

Japanese stationery brand

Coordinates: 35.7653°N 139.7474°E

Tombow Pencil Co., Ltd.

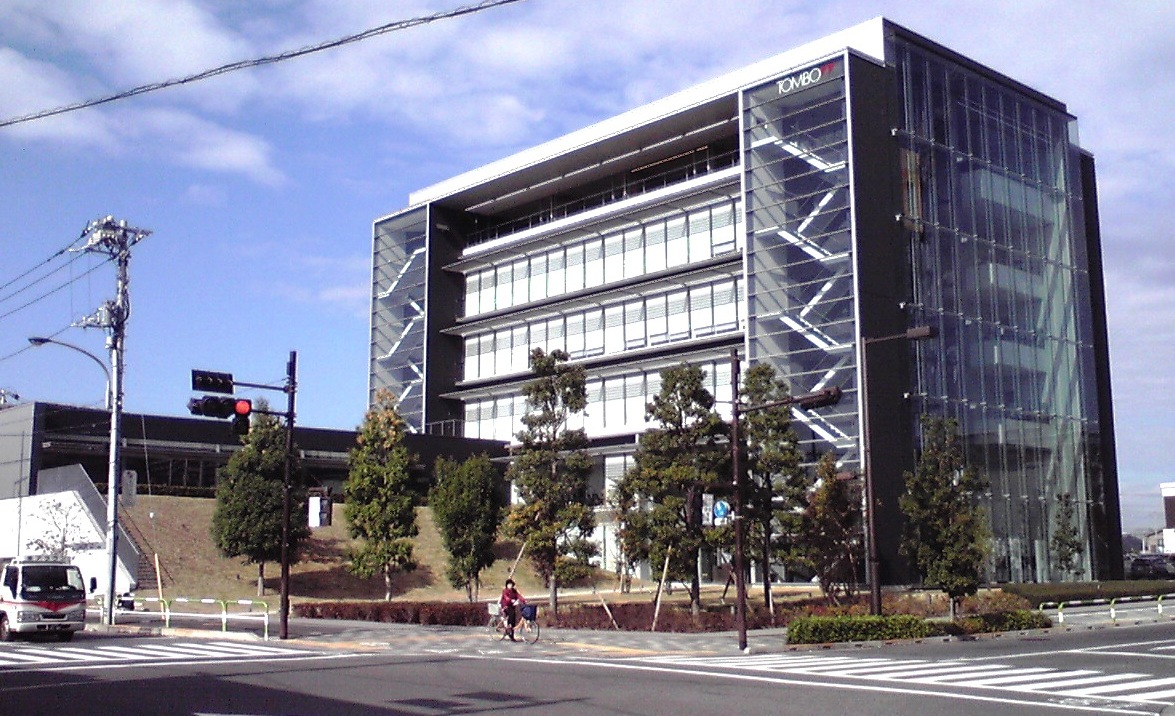
- Tombow headquarters building in Tokyo
- Native name: 株式会社トンボ鉛筆
- Type: Private KK
- Industry: Stationery
- Founded: 1913; 113 years ago
- Founder: Harunosuke Ogawa
- Headquarters: Kita, Japan
- Area served: Worldwide
- Key people: Akihiro Ogawa (President and CEO)
- Products: Writing implements, office supplies
- Brands: Mono; Pit; Zoom; Ippo!; Yo-i
- Number of employees: 397 (as of June, 2015)
- Website: tombow.com

Tombow Pencil Co., Ltd. (株式会社トンボ鉛筆, Kabushiki-gaisha Tonbo Enpitsu) is a private Japanese manufacturing company of stationery products. The company was founded in 1913 as Messrs "Tombow" and has since grown into an international business. Based in Tokyo with 397 employees.

Tombow also has two overseas production facilities in Thailand and Vietnam. Tombow Thailand is the first overseas factory of Tombow with 425 employees (as of December 2007) and 6,480 square meters building area.

== History ==
The company was established in 1913, when Harunosuke Ogawa opened a shop in Asakusa, with the name "Harunosuke Ogawa Pencil". One year later, the Mason brand of pencil was released. That was followed by other products, named "Stick", "Submarine" (1915), "Kaiman Roro", and "Cabinet" (in 1916).

The dragonfly figure ("Tonbo" in Japanese – トンボ) was registered by the company as trademark for its pencils in 1927. During the following years, Tombow continued launching new lines of pencils. In December 1939, Harunosuke Ogawa Shoten incorporated as two companies, Tombow Pencil Manufacturing Co., Ltd. (manufacturing) and Tombow Pencil Trade Co. Ltd. (sales). The company launched an eraser manufactured by fats and oils without using rubber.

In 1946, the company added pencil sharpeners to its catalog of products. In 1954, the company relocated the headquarters from Taitō to Nihonbashi in Chūō, Tokyo, with expansion of business. Four years later, the first ballpoint pens and markers were released, which consolidated Tombow as a manufacturer of all types of writing implements. In 1962, the company released an electric pencil sharpener. In November 1968, the Tombow pencil head office was moved to Kita, Tokyo, where it still remains.

The Tombow Ballpen Co., division, was established in 1973. The company established its first European location in 1980, in Cologne, Germany, the "Tombow Pen & Pencil GmbH". International operations expanded to the United States (1983 in Westlake Village, California), Thailand (1990 in Bangkok), Vietnam (2003), and China (2011).

== Products ==
Tombow produces and markets a wide range of products, marketed through its own name and/or other brands. Tombow's product line includes the "dual brush", a type of marker pen with a brush-shaped tip that provides different sizes of strokes, depending on angle and pressure. It has a water-based ink and brush is made of nylon bristles. It was inspired on traditional ink brushes and inksticks used in Japanese calligraphy.

Current products line includes:

Category	Products
Writing instruments	Pencils, ballpoint pens, mechanical pencils, markers, highlighters, refills
Art materials	Crayons, colored pencils, brush pens
Office supplies	Erasers, correction tapes, adhesives, glue tape, glue sticks

== Brands ==
=== Mono ===
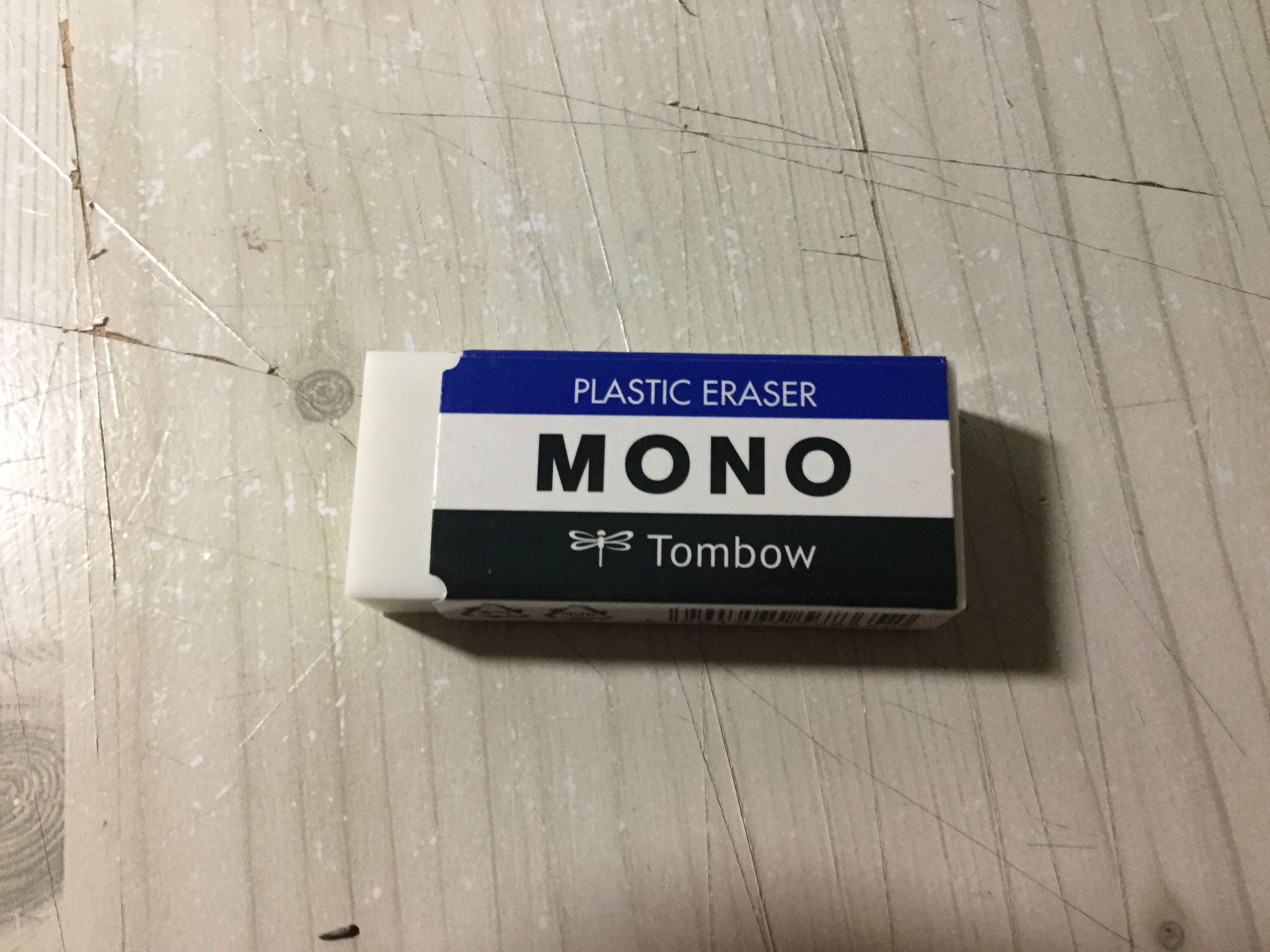
Mono eraser

The "Mono" (from the Greek "monos", translated to "special" or "only") brand was introduced in 1963, initially for a line of pencils. Nowadays, Mono brand comprises different pencils, erasers, mechanical pencils, and correction tapes.

Wood-cased pencils include: Mono 100 (17 grades), Mono (14 grades), Mono R (7 grades).

Mechanical pencils include: Mono Graph, Mono Graph Zero, Mono Graph One.

Block Erasers include: Mono Plastic Eraser (Material: PVC), Mono Dust Catch (PVC).

Stick erasers include: Mono Zero (Elastomer), Mono Stick (PVC), Mono One (PVC).

=== Pit ===
The Pit brand was introduced in 1971 to name Tombow's glue sticks. In 1980, the first Pit liquid glue was launched to market. The last product of the Pit line to be introduced was the glue tape, in 1997.

=== Zoom ===
Zoom was born as a ballpoint pen and mechanical pencil brand in 1986. The Zoom 414 pen, designed by Kazunori Katami, won the Red Dot design award in 2007. It combines a ballpoint pen, a mechanical pencil, a highlighter and an eraser in one slim design.

=== Other brands ===
Other brands of the group are Yo-i and Ippo!, with products designed for children. The 8900 pencil series (graphite and coloured cores) is also popular in Japan.

Wood-cased pencils for general use include: 8900 (6 grades), 8900V (Red), 8900VP (Red and Blue), 8900P (Blue), 2558 (3 grades).
