= Kuretake (art products) =

Japanese manufacturing company

Kuretake Co., Ltd.
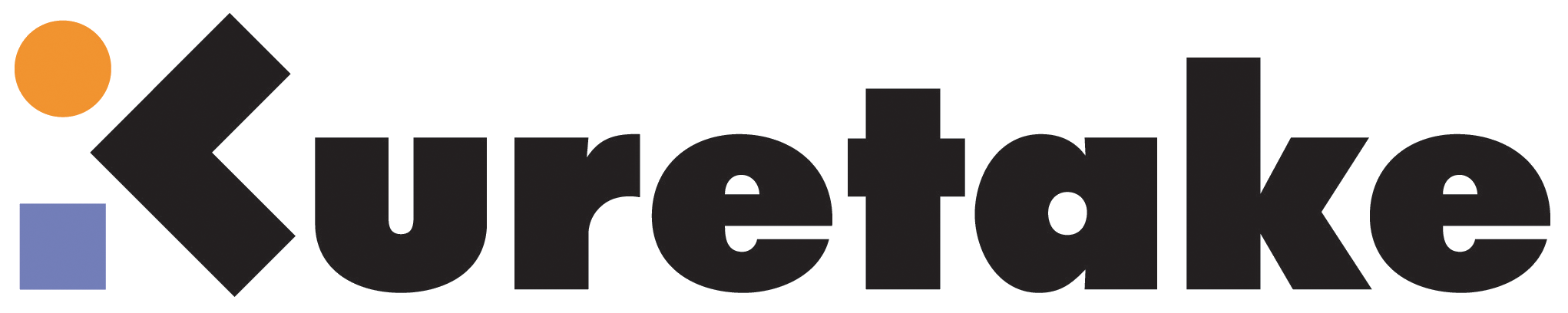
- Company type: Private
- Industry: Stationery
- Founded: 1902; 124 years ago
- Founder: Narakichi Watatani
- Headquarters: Nara, Japan
- Area served: Worldwide
- Key people: Masanori Watatani, President
- Products: Markers, brush pens, inks
- Brands: Zig; ScrapBooking
- Number of employees: 252
- Website: kuretakezig.us

Kuretake Co., Ltd. (株式会社くれたけ, Kabushiki Gaisha Kure Take) is a Japanese manufacturing company of writing implements. The firm began its activities manufacturing sumi ink and brushes and then expanded its range of products, producing mainly pens.

Current range of products manufactured by Kuretake includes markers, brush pens, inks, watercolors.

== History ==
Founded under the name of "Kuretake Sumi" in 1902, the company originally started by producing sumi brushes, a brush similar in style to certain watercolor brushes, sharing a generally thick wooden or bamboo handle, and a broad soft hair brush that when wetted form a fine tip. The brushes produced by Kuretake Sumi were designed for sumi-e, or inkwash painting.

In 1965, Kuretake Industries Co., Ltd. was established as a plant specializing in the production of writing instruments while Tokyo office was established. In 1986, a subsidiary, "Kuretake U.K. Ltd." was established in the West Midlands, England. In 2014 another subsidiary, "Kuretake ZIG Corporation" was established in Sacramento, United States.

== Products ==
Kuretake (and its subsidiary brand, "Zig") manufactures a wide variety of markers, such as highlighters and watercolor markers.

The firm also gained reputation for its "brush pen", similar to a marker pen with a brush-shapered flexible tip but refillable, using replaceable ink cartridges like fountain pens do. The brush pen by Kuretake was the first using cartridges (although Pentel would later launch a brush model that used cartridges also).

Through its brand "ScrapBooking", Kuretake produces other stationery items such as papers, templates, corner punches, color selectors, and photo tapes.
