= Darklighter =

Darklighter or dark lighter may refer to:

== Star Wars ==
- Biggs Darklighter, a character from the 1977 film Star Wars: Episode IV: A New Hope, a starfighter pilot and Luke Skywalker's best friend
- Gavin Darklighter, a Star Wars Legends (Star Wars Expanded Universe; SWEU) character, a starfighter pilot and squadron commander
- Star Wars: Empire: Volume 2: Darklighter, a story arc in the Star Wars: Empire comic book serial focusing on Biggs Darklighter
- Darklighter Farm, a fictional location found in Star Wars: X-wing – Rogue Squadron

== Other uses ==
- Darklighter (Charmed), a character class in the U.S. fantasy TV drama Charmed on the side of the forces of evil
- Darklighters, a character class created by William Wall (filmmaker) for his Zero film series

== See also ==
- Darklight (disambiguation)
- Whitelighter
- Highlighter
- Low-key lighting
- Dark lightning
