= Tetrasodium 1,3,6,8-pyrenetetrasulfonate =

Names
- IUPAC name Tetrasodium 1,3,6,8-pyrenetetrasulfonate
- Other names: 1,3,6,8-Pyrenetetrasulfonic acid, tetrasodium salt; 1,3,6,8-Tetrasodium pyrenetetrasulfonate; Sodium pyrene-1,3,6,8-tetrasulfonate; Tetrasodium pyrene-1,3,6,8-tetrasulfonate; Trasar 23299

Identifiers
CAS Number	59572-10-0
3D model (JSmol)	Interactive image
ChemSpider	91325
ECHA InfoCard	100.154.826
EC Number	626-424-1
PubChem CID	101082
UNII	P062LD4V71
CompTox Dashboard (EPA)	DTXSID9041233
- InChI: InChI=1S/C16H10O12S4.4Na/c17-29(18,19)11-5-13(31(23,24)25)9-3-4-10-14(32(26,27)28)6-12(30(20,21)22)8-2-1-7(11)15(9)16(8)10;;;;/h1-6H,(H,17,18,19)(H,20,21,22)(H,23,24,25)(H,26,27,28);;;;/q;4*+1/p-4 Key: UZBIRLJMURQVMX-UHFFFAOYSA-J
- SMILES: C1=CC2=C3C(=C(C=C2S(=O)(=O)[O-])S(=O)(=O)[O-])C=CC4=C(C=C(C1=C43)S(=O)(=O)[O-])S(=O)(=O)[O-].[Na+].[Na+].[Na+].[Na+]

Properties
Chemical formula	C_{16}H_{6}Na_{4}O_{12}S_{4}
Molar mass	610.41 g·mol^{−1}
Appearance	Green crystalline powder
Melting point	102-104 °C
Solubility in water	Soluble

Hazards
- GHS labelling
Pictograms	(GHS07: Exclamation mark)
Signal word	Warning
Hazard statements	H315, H319, H335
Precautionary statements	P261, P264, P264+P265, P271, P280, P302+P352, P304+P340, P305+P351+P338, P319, P321, P332+P317, P337+P317, P362+P364, P403+P233, P405, P501

Related compounds
Related compounds	Pyranine
- Except where otherwise noted, data are given for materials in their standard state (at 25 °C [77 °F], 100 kPa). verify (what is ?) Infobox references

Tetrasodium 1,3,6,8-pyrenetetrasulfonate is a highly water-soluble derivative of pyrene, a polycyclic aromatic hydrocarbon

The compound can be synthesized in one step by treating pyrene with 50% oleum and sodium sulfate. A traditional two-step method was treating the pyrene with sulfuric acid and sodium sulfate and then treating it with 60% oleum and sodium sulfate.
