= Black Light (comics) =

Black Light or Blacklight, in comics, may refer to:

- Black Light (2000 AD), a series in British science fiction comic 2000 AD
- Blacklight (Image Comics), two Image Comics characters
- Blacklight (MC2), a Marvel Comics character

== See also ==
- Black Light (disambiguation)
- Kai-ro, for a Batman Beyond character
- Black Lightning
