= MyM =

British entertainment magazine (2012–2018)

- MyM Issue #49, April 2015
- Editor: Matt Chapman
- Categories: Film magazine
- Frequency: Monthly
- First issue: May 2012
- Final issue: February 2018
- Company: MCM Expo Group/ReedPop
- Country: United Kingdom
- Website: www.mymbuzz.net
- ISSN: 2049-8187

MyM (pronounced "My-em") was an 84-page monthly entertainment magazine published in the United Kingdom by the MCM Expo Group. Originally focusing on various aspects of Japanese pop culture, including anime, manga, Japanese cinema and music, cosplay, lolita fashion and video games, it later broadened its reach to become a fully rounded entertainment magazine, including features and interviews on mainstream films, television programmes, comics, books and music.

The magazine's various review sections included releases in those same areas of entertainment, while the news and feature sections also report on films, TV, video games, anime, manga and comics. Regular feature "My Goodies" includes the best toys, gadgets, T-shirts, games, models and merchandise, while fellow regular "Planet Japan" delivers a snapshot of life in that region. The cosplay section included interviews, tips and posters, backed up by a "Fashion Watch" page which highlighted the best J-fashion and beyond. A "MyMag" section originally published readers' reviews but has been superseded by a "Reader's Art" page, which included drawings, illustrations and photography. Meanwhile, regular music interviews featured J-pop and K-pop acts, as well as mainstream acts and big-name film, TV and video game composers.

The first issue of MyM was published on 3 May 2012 and was edited by its publisher, Tarik Alozdi. In October 2012, it was announced that the MCM Expo Group, which runs events such as London MCM Expo, had purchased the magazine. Jody Raynsford edited the magazine for three issues, until news editor Matt Chapman took over as editor from issue 15.

On 23 October 2017, ReedPop acquired MCM.

MyM released its final magazine issue (Issue 71) on 16 February 2018.

== Regulars ==
=== The Top 10 ===
Counting down the magazine's top 10 choices on a particular subject. Topics usually followed the magazine's interests and included music, films, TV, books, anime, manga and video games. It was introduced by editor Matt Chapman in Issue 31.

Subjects included: obscure manga (Issue 31) board games (Issue 32), video game villains (Issue 33), movie aliens (Issue 34), anime heroines (Issue 35), sidekicks (Issue 36), movie deaths (Issue 37), video game soundtracks (Issue 38), X-Files episodes (Issue 39), Game of Thrones shocks (Issue 40), anime romances (Issue 41), man-versus-nature movies (Issue 42), movie dinosaurs (Issue 43), mecha anime (Issue 44), anti-Christmas movies (Issue 45), Comic-book Rivalries (Issue 46), Free-to-play video games (Issue 47) and Films about films (Issue 48).

=== My Media ===
This section interviewed celebrities and asked them to choose their favourites from a wide range of media. It typically included four picks from music, film, TV, books and comics. It was introduced by editor Matt Chapman in Issue 34.

The section included film directors Adam Green (Hatchet), Daniel Simpson (The Rendlesham UFO Incident), Charles Band (Trancers), and Eduardo Sanchez (The Blair Witch Project); actors Sarah Snook (Predestination), Greg Grunberg (Heroes), Robert Llewellyn (Red Dwarf) and Sarah Bolger (Emelie); voice actors Mark Meer (Mass Effect) and Quinton Flynn (Metal Gear); authors R.A. Salvatore (The DemonWars Saga), Erin M. Evans (Brimstone Angels), Patrick Rothfuss (The Slow Regard of Silent Things) and Paul Tobin (How to Capture an Invisible Cat); and comic-book artist Al Davison.

=== My Goodies ===
This section rounded up the best toys, games, action figures, T-shirts, jewellery, gadgets, books and other products, usually with a geeky theme to match the interests of the audience.

In Issue 47 this section was sponsored for the first time, by online retailer Jammy Devil Games.

=== Planet Japan ===
This two-page spread initially looked at unusual events in Japan and highlighted entertainment from that region. It later switched from being a single page in some issues to a two-page spread in others, giving a snapshot of life in Japan. Model and teacher Katie Carter - AKA Capsule Bunny - often featured, although a column of Japanese travel advice also ran in this section.

== Special issues ==
MyM occasionally dedicated the majority of its feature space to a single topic. The first issue to be billed as a 'special' was Issue 25 (April 2014), which was an Anime Special to coincide with the release of Miyazaki's The Wind Rises and included an extract from Anime: A History by Jonathan Clements. Issue 35 (February 2015) was the next Anime Special (looking at Kantai Collection, anime reboots, an update to the Anime Encyclopedia, the 'Top 10' anime heroines and the best winter streaming series); with Issue 44 also giving over much of its space to the same topic (including an in-depth look at Tatsunoko Production, LeSean Thomas on his Cannon Busters pilot, the 'Top 10' mecha anime shows, new autumn anime streaming shows and interviews from Scotland Loves Anime).

Issue 26 (May 2014) was a Monster Special and featured exclusive Godzilla art on its cover, along with a feature on the Godzilla reboot and retrospectives on that monster and fellow Kaiju Gamera and Daimajin, plus an interview with Willow Creek director Bobcat Goldthwait.

Meanwhile, Issue 38 (May 2015) was a Music Special that included features on visual kei bands, a history of K-pop, a Pitch Perfect 2 interview, an in-depth look at the Burning Man festival, an interview with Greg Grunberg of the Band From TV, My Chemical Romance's Frank Iero on his solo album and a countdown of the 'Top 10' videogame soundtracks, as well as news on Disney's Tangled musical, the Glastonbury festival and J-rock events in London.

== MyM Mascot ==
MyM mascot Mya Tenshi in Issue 30

The official mascot of MyM was an angel called Mya Tenshi. She appeared on page three of the magazine, above the editor's letter. She appeared in the following issues: 1–9; 11; 13–17; 19–21; 23; 26; and 30–60.

She has been drawn in many forms by artists who are MyM readers, including: ● James Clarkson (Issues 1, 3, 8, 14, 16, 35) ● Donna Evans (Issues 2 and 9) ● Ruusu-Chan (Issues 4, 35) ● Michelle Dunning (Issue 5) ● Tienette Setou (Issues 6, 30, 35) ● Fiona Whitton (Issue 7) ● Ellen Cahill (Issues 11 and 34) ● Emily McGorman (Issues 13, 15, 20, 23, 26, 35) ● Mike Kay (Issues 17, 19, 21, 32, 33, 35, 42, 52, 57) ● Lucy crew (Issue 37) ● Claire Courtney (Issues 38, 50) ● Katya Busuttil (Issue 39) ● Rey Curley (Issues 41 and 49) ● Alexandra Dragusanu (Issues 44, 51) ● Barry Spiers (Issues 45, 54) ● Ben Farnell (Issues 46, 58) ● David Milburn (Issue 47) ● Hannah Meyers (Issue 48) ● Brett Knapp (Issue 53) ● Mark Mitchell (Issue 56)

A number of professional artists have also drawn Mya Tenshi. As a promotion for the web series Zombies On Ramsay Street in Issue 31, illustrator Tim Molloy zombified James Clarkson's version of Mya Tenshi. This zombie image was used again in Issues 36, 55 and 67, as the magazine contained a number of horror-related features or it fitted in with Halloween. Issue 38 saw MCMBuzz.com artist Claire Courtney draw Mya Tenshi with a birthday cake, to celebrate the magazine's third anniversary. In Issue 40, illustrator Phil Hankinson created an abstract version of Mya Tenshi using a digital stylus and an iPad Mini. Hankinson had reviewed the Wacom Intuos Creative Stylus 2 in the same issue. And in Issue 43, artist Chris Jones created an image using Kuretake art products.

In Issue 35 MyM ran images by a number of different artists to illustrate the different ways Mya Tenshi had been drawn by the magazine's readers. It also called for new submissions in the magazine and online, offering a goodie bag as a prize for successful submissions. In Issue 43 a similar promotion was run in conjunction with art supplies company Kuretake, with readers offered the chance to win a selection of Kuretake's products.

== Issue contents ==
Issue number	Month Of release	Contents
Issue 49	April 2016	Features: Captain America: Civil War, The Call Up, Pretty Cure, Matt Leacock and Zev Shlasinger interview, Patrick Rothfuss interview Event reports: Virtually Dead, The National Student Roleplaying and Wargaming Championships, MCM Birmingham Comic Con, MCM Liverpool Comic Con Film and TV reviews: The Jungle Book, Star Wars: The Force Awakens, The Night Manager, The Huntsman: Winter's War, Bastille Day, Beowulf: Return to the Shieldlands, The Case Of Hana & Alice, The Last Man On The Moon, Uzumasa Limelight, Evolution, Parasyte: The Movie, Batman v Superman: Dawn of Justice, Late Shift, The Monster Chronicles: Tiktik, Burial Ground, The Timber Video game reviews/previews: TBC Anime reviews: TBC Manga and Comic reviews: Marshals, The Ten-Seconders, The Imitation Game, Hour of the Zombie Volume 1, Mysterious Girlfriend X Volume 1, Goodnight Punpun Volume 1, Real Account Volume 1 Music: Newton Faulkner interview
Issue 45	December 2015	Features: Beowulf: Return to the Shieldlands set visit, Massive 2015 Review & 2016 Preview, Top 10: Anti-Christmas Movies, Shigeto Koyama interview, Cat Cafes, Battle Royale 15th Anniversary Retrospective, Hirokazu Koreeda interview, Erin M. Evans interview Event reports: MCM Birmingham Comic Con Film and TV reviews: Aaaaaaaah!, Attack on Titan, The Good Dinosaur, Halo: Fall of Reach, Heist, Krampus, Sinister 2, Victor Frankenstein, The Wolfpack Video game reviews/previews: Far Cry Primal, Deus Ex: Mankind Divided, Arslan: The Warriors of Legend, Just Cause 3, Tom Clancy’s Rainbow Six Siege, Xenoblade Chronicles X, Sword Art Online: Lost Song, Star Wars Battlefront Anime reviews: Ghost in the Shell Arise, Full Metal Panic!, Coppelion, So, I Can’t Play H!, Beyond The Boundary, Blade & Soul, Black Bullet, Danganronpa, Sword Art Online II Manga and Comic reviews: Hautville House Volume 1, Two Brothers, Crossed + One Hundred Volume 1, Platinum End Chapter 1, Yo-kai Watch Volume 1, School-Live Volume 1 Music: Kamijo interview, Boys Republic interview
Issue 44	November 2015 (Anime Special)	Features: Tatsunoko Production, LeSean Thomas's Cannon Busters, the Top Ten mecha anime shows, autumn anime streaming, New York Times and Sunday Times bestselling author Brian J Robb on The Hunger Games’ effect, Philip K. Dick TV adaptation The Man in the High Castle Event reports: Scotland Loves Anime Film and TV reviews: Better Call Saul Season 1, Agent Carter Season 1, The Hunger Games: Mockingjay - Part 2, Black Mass, The Hallow, Colt 45, Steve Jobs, Dick Whittington Video game reviews/previews: Fallout 4, Call of Duty: Black Ops III, Assassin’s Creed Syndicate, Minecraft: Story Mode, Tales from the Borderlands, Life is Strange, Bedlam, Rock Band 4 and Guitar Hero Live. Anime reviews: Flowers of Evil, The Eccentric Family, Mobile Suit Gundam, Fate/kaleid liner Prisma Illya, Naruto the Movie: Road to Ninja, The Boy and the Beast Manga and Comic reviews: Surface Tension 5, Killing and Dying, The Grievous Journey of Ichabod Azrael (and the Dead Left in his Wake), Astro Boy Omnibus 1, Naruto Volume 72, JoJo's Bizarre Adventure Part 2: Battle Tendency Volume 1 Music: Tiger Lab Vinyl on ’80s and ’90s anime soundtracks
Issue 38	May 2015 (Music Special)	Features: Nadia: The Secret Of Blue Water creator Hideaki Anno, set visit to special effects house Artem, Doraemon Music: Actress Rebel Wilson on Pitch Perfect 2, an in-depth look at Burning Man, a guide to Visual Kei bands, a newbie's guide to K-pop, the Top 10 video game soundtracks, actor Greg Grunberg on the Band from TV, My Chemical Romance's Frank Iero on his solo album, Paul Terry on Cellarscape's Independent Music Awards nomination Event reports: The Tribeca Film Festival, Planet Japan at Harajuku Fashion Week Film and TV reviews: Mad Max: Fury Road, A Most Violent Year, Shaun The Sheep, Pitch Perfect 2, Whiplash, Danny Collins, The Last Five Years, The Heart Is A Drum Machine, Supernatural Season 9, Rurouni Kenshin 3, Killer Mermaids, Be My Baby, American Ninja Video game reviews/previews: Naruto Shippuden: Ultimate Ninja Storm 4, J-Stars Victory VS+, One Piece: Pirate Warriors 3, Omega Quintet, Puzzle & Dragons Z + Super Mario Bros. Edition, Wolfenstein: The Old Blood, Broken Age: Act 2, LEGO Jurassic World, Killing Floor 2, Trine 3: The Artifacts Of Power Anime reviews: Nadia: The Secret of Blue Water, One Piece: Film Z, Kill la Kill Volume 3, Sankarea: Undying Love, Shakugan no Shana Season 2, Bleach Manga and Comic reviews: Nemo: River Of Ghosts, Shame: Redemption, The Legend Of Zelda: A Link To The Past, Yamada-kun And The Seven Witches, The World’s Greatest First Love, Gyo
Issue 37	April 2015	Features: Joss Whedon talks Avengers: Age Of Ultron, Five fantasy writers discuss the industry, Top 10 Movie Deaths, Fan Films, My Media with Mark Meer Event reports: EGX Rezzed, MCM Birmingham Comic Con, Planet Japan at Comiket Film and TV reviews: The Asylum, Automata, Bad Land: Road To Fury, Exit, Fast & Furious 7, Hemlock Grove Season 2, I Am Big Bird, Last Knights, The Last Survivors, Mankind’s Last Stand, Monsters: Dark Continent, The Salvation, Tinker Bell And The Legend Of The Neverbeast and World War Dead: Rise Of The Fallen Videogame reviews/previews: Guild Wars 2: Heart Of Thorns, Toukiden: Kiwami, Bladestorm: Nightmare, A Pixel Story, Final Fantasy Type-0 HD, Final Fantasy XV: Episode Duscae, Bloodborne, Dark Souls II: Scholar Of The First Sin Anime reviews: Gatchaman Crowds, Wings Of Honneamise, Log Horizon, Harlock Space Pirate, Tiger & Bunny: The Rising, Nisekoi, Yu-Gi-Oh! Season 2, One Piece (Uncut) Collection 9, Rooster Teeth’s RWBY, Needless Manga and Comic reviews: Osamu Tezuka’s Captain Ken, Log Horizon, Dredd: Urban Warfare, Love And Rockets: Ofelia Music: Interview with all-girl group Scandal, Chuck: Original TV soundtrack
Issue 36	March 2015	Features: Final Fantasy Type-0, Twin Peaks retrospective, Ju-on: The Grudge, Tokyo Ghoul, Parasyte, Interview with Studio Ghibli co-founder Isao Takahata, My Media with Blair Witch director Eduardo Sanchez, Top 10 Comic Sidekicks Event reports: MCM Midlands Comic Con, Harajuku Fashion Walk Film and TV reviews: John Wick, Cinderella, Frozen Fever, Paddington, The Homesman, Halo: Nightfall, Electricity, Chappie, The Square Circle, Clown, The Internet's Own Boy, From Inside, Continuum, Tokyo Tribe, Seventh Son, The Signal, Exists, The SpongeBob Movie: A Sponge Out Of Water Videogame reviews/previews: Interview with Bladestorm: Nightmare's Akihiro Suzuki, Resident Evil: Revelations 2, Hyperdevotion Noire, Dragon Ball Xenoverse, Evolve, Fantasy Hero: Unsigned Legacy, Under Night In-Birth Exe: Late, htoL#NiQ: The Firefly Diary Anime reviews: Tsuritama, Good Luck Girl!, The Ambition Of Oda Nobuna, Koimonogatari, Kill La Kill Part 2, Ben-To Complete Series Collection, Ef - A Tale Of Memories & Melodies, Bleach Series 14 Part 2, Isao Takahata And His Tale Of Princess Kaguya Manga and Comic reviews: Maria The Virgin Witch Volume 1, Nocturne - The Walled Trilogy Book 2, Neon Genesis Evangelion Volume 14, SAM 1 - After Man Cosplay and fashion: Prop maker and cosplayer extraordinaire Tabitha Lyons, ninja cosplayer GandaKris and the fashion of Japanese kimonos Music: Interview with artist Andy Holden from The Grubby Mitts
Issue 35	February 2015 (Anime Special)	Features: Dragon Ball Xenoverse, American Ninja, Welcome To Knight Vale, Kantai Collection, The A-Z of Anime, Top 10 Anime Heroines, Anime Reboots, My Media with Sarah Snook Event reports: The Toy Fair 2015 Film and TV reviews: Nightcrawler, Horns, Jupiter Ascending, It Follows, '71, Robot Overlords, Predestination, The Voices, Project Almanac, The Shanghai 13, Legend Of The Lone Ranger, Wolves, Kumiko, The Treasure Hunter, Drew: The Man Behind The Poster Videogame reviews/previews: Monster Hunter 4 Ultimate, The Legend Of Zelda: Majora’s Mask 3D, Criminal Girls: Invite Only, Suikoden 1 & 2, Grim Fandango, Atelier Ayesha Plus: The Alchemist Of Dusk Anime reviews: The Tale Of The Princess Kaguya, A Letter To Momo, Michiko & Hatchin Part 2, Kamisama Dolls, Fairy Tail Part 9, Onimonogatari, Tiger And Bunny: The Beginning, Perfect Blue Manga and Comic reviews: JoJo’s Bizarre Adventure Part I Volume 1, Akame Ga Kill! Volume 1, Yu-Gi-Oh Omnibus 1, The Bicycle Music: Interview with multicultural band Cross Gene, AKB48's Olympic song, Album of the month: MUCC's The End Of The World Cosplay and fashion: Dutch cosplayer Iloon, Coslifers and create your own kawaii clothes
Issue 34	January 2015	Features: Monster Hunter 4 Ultimate, interviews with three comic creators, Animatsu interview, Harlock Space Pirate, interview with Hwang Jang Lee, Top 10 Movie Aliens, Rise Of The Anime Robots, Toys To Life retrospective Event reports: TBC Film, TV and theatre reviews: Game Of Thrones Season 4, Black Mirror: White Christmas, Kingsman: The Secret Service, The Gigantic Beard That Was Evil, Zulu, Wakolda, Extant Season 1, Grateful Dead, Very Good Girls, Night Train To Lisbon, The Giver, School Of Babel, The Rendlesham UFO Incident Videogame reviews/previews: TBC Anime reviews: TBC Manga and Comic reviews: TBC Music: Interview with Goblin frontman Claudio Simonetti, interview with guitar shredder The Great Kat, album of the month: Have A Nice Day by World Order Cosplay and fashion: TBC
Issue 33	December 2014	Features: Massive 2015 Preview of movies, games, TV, anime, manga, comics and music, Netflix's Marco Polo cast interviews, Mizuho Nishikubo on Giovanni's Island, Disney's Into The Woods cast interview, interview with Shinichiro Watanabe, Top 10 Videogame Villains Event reports: MCM Birmingham Comic Con Film and TV reviews: The Guest, Into The Woods, Sin City 2: A Dame To Kill For, Pulp Fiction 20th Anniversary Edition, The Hobbit: The Battle Of The Five Armies, The Penguins Of Madagascar, The Theory Of Everything, Honeymoon, Dead Snow 2: Red Vs Dead, Animal House Of Blues, Pokémon The Movie: Diancie And The Cocoon Of Destruction, The Kingdom Of Dreams And Madness Videogame reviews/previews: TBC Anime reviews: TBC Manga and Comic reviews: TBC Music: Interview with Jent, Album of the month: Standard by Scandal Cosplay and fashion: TBC
Issue 32	November 2014	Features: The Hunger Games: Mockingjay – Part 1, Massive 2014 Review, What's Next For Ghibli?, Kung Fu Jungle, Indie Games Preview, Top 10 Board Games, Autumn's Anime Streams Show reports: October's London MCM Comic Con, The Doctor Who Experience Film reviews: Big Hero 6, Interstellar, The Hunger Games: Mockingjay – Part 1, Kung Fu Jungle, The Hayao Miyazaki Blu-ray Collection, Begin Again, There’s Something About Susan Videogame reviews/previews: Halo: The Master Chief Collection, The Evil Within, Shin Megami Tensei IV, Lords Of The Fallen, Skylanders: Trap Team, Fantasia: Music Evolved, Disney Magical World, Sleeping Dogs: Definitive Edition, The Legend Of Korra, Deadcore, Pac-Man And The Ghostly Adventures 2, MX Vs ATV Motocross, Shadow Warrior, Pix The Cat, TRI: Of Friendship And Madness, Tales Of Hearts R, Power Rangers Super Megaforce, Ultimate NES Remix, Styx: Master Of Shadows, Senran Kagura: Shinovi Versus, Call Of Duty: Advanced Warfare, Falling Skies: The Game, Civilization: Beyond Earth, Borderlands: The Pre-Sequel!, Kingdom Hearts HD 2.5 ReMIX Anime and manga reviews: No Game No Life Volume 1, Milkyway Hitchhiking Volume 1, The Melancholy Of Haruhi Suzumiya Volume 20, Kill La Kill Collector's Edition Part 1, Ghost In The Shell ARISE - BORDERS 1 & 2, Yu-Gi-Oh! The Official First Season, Usagi Drop, Bayonetta: Bloody Fate, Dragon Ball Z: Battle Of Gods, Space Dandy, The Devil Is A Part-Timer, One Piece: Movie Collection 3, One Piece Collection 8, Blast Of Tempest Part 1, Samurai Champloo Complete Collection, The Princess And The Pilot, Nekomonogatari White Music: Interview with composer Darryl John Hannan, interview with the band Heroine Syndrome, album of the month: Me! Me! Me! by Inoue Joe
Issue 31	October 2014	Features: Bayonetta 2, Big Hero 6, Neil Gaiman interview, Marvel in Japan, Harry Potter Cover Art, Top 10 Obscure Manga Show reports: EGX 2014 Film and TV reviews: Horns, Agents Of S.H.I.E.L.D. Season 1, Zombeavers, Teenage Mutant Ninja Turtles, Magic In The Moonlight, Dracula Untold, The Calling, Kite, Sharknado 2, Gutshot, Saints & Soldiers - The Void, Extraterrestrial Videogame reviews/previews: Bayonetta 2, Destiny, Alien Isolation, Super Smash Bros., Middle-earth: Shadow Of Mordor, Samurai Warriors 4, Disney Infinity 2.0, Akiba’s Trip: Undead & Undressed, Natural Doctrine, Naruto Shippuden: Ultimate Ninja Storm Revolution, Ar Nosurge: Ode To An Unborn Star Anime and manga reviews: Attack On Titan, Appleseed Alpha, HAL, Garden Of Sinners, Devil Survivor 2, Kokoro Connect OVA collection, From The New World, Naruto Shippuden, Dragon Ball Music: Album of the month: Miyavi by Miyavi
Issue 30	September 2014	Features: The Maze Runner, Bedlam, The Boxtrolls, The Wind Rises, Bryce Papenbrook interview, Kokoro Connect Show reports: Comiket, Gamescom, MCM Scotland Comic Con Film and TV reviews: A Walk Among The Tombstones, The Maze Runner, The Boxtrolls, Sabotage, Wolf Creek 2, The Walking Dead Season 4, Grand Piano, Road, The Short Game, From Dusk Till Dawn: The TV series, HK: Forbidden Superhero Videogame reviews/previews: Hyrule Warriors, Theatrhythm Final Fantasy: Curtain Call, Disgaea 4, Hyperdimension Neptunia, Fantasy Life, The Last Of Us Remastered, Hohokum, Metro Redux, Warriors Orochi 3 Ultimate, Sword Art Online: Hollow Fragment Anime and manga reviews: Blue Exorcist, Attack On Titan, Berserk: Golden Age Arc III - The Advent, One Piece Movie Collection, Gargantia On The Verdurous Planet, Gurren Lagann, Ghost In The Shell, Toradora!, Bodacious Space Pirates, Karneval, Arcana Famiglia, Kokoro Connect Music: Interview with voice actor and musician Greg Cipes, album of the month: Literal World by Kishida Kyoudan & The Akeboshi Rockets
Issue 29	August 2014	Features: Attack On Titan, Sin City: A Dame To Kill For, The Expendables 3, Soul Eater NOT!, Summer Anime Streaming Round-up, The A-Z Of Dragonball Show reports: San Diego Comic-Con, Los Angeles Anime Expo, MCM Manchester Comic Con Film reviews: Guardians Of The Galaxy, Lucy, The Expendables 3, Warrior King 2, Blue Ruin, Pioneer, Capricorn One, Million Dollar Arm, The Informant, They Came Together, Killers, Planes 2, The Notorious Mr. Bout Videogame reviews/previews: Destiny, Lords Of The Fallen, Lara Croft And The Temple Of Osiris, Civilization: Beyond Earth, Tales Of Xillia 2, Naruto Shippuden: Ultimate Ninja Storm Revolution, Divinity: Original Sin, Gods Will Be Watching, Shovel Knight, The Wolf Among Us, Cry Wolf Anime and manga reviews: Psycho-Pass, Mardock Scramble: The Third Exhaust, From The New World, Robotics;Notes, Jormungand: Perfect Order, Mysterious Girlfriend X, Campione!, One Piece, Fairy Tail, Dragon Ball, Nekomonogatari Black Music: Sonisphere 2014 festival review
Issue 28	July 2014	Features: The Raid 2, Luc Besson's Lucy, Felicia Day interview, Wendee Lee interview, Kazutoki Kono interview Show reports: E3, Annecy International Animated Film Festival Film and TV reviews: Transformers 4, The Raid 2, Her, Earth To Echo, Divergent, Memoirs Of A Survivor, Strange Hill, Haunter, The Congress Videogame reviews/previews: One Piece: Unlimited World RED, Atelier Rorona Plus, Dynasty Warriors: GUNDAM Reborn, Super Ultra Dead Rising 3 Arcade Remix Hyper Edition EX Plus Alpha, Valiant Hearts, Monster Monpiece Anime and manga reviews: One Piece: Strong World, Fairy Tail: The Movie, Familiar Of Zero, Jormungand, Kamisama Kiss, Naruto, Dragon Ball, We Without Wings, Ikki Tousen: Xtreme Xecutor, Accel World Music: Yoshiki interview, Connor Linning
Issue 27	June 2014	Features: Blue Exorcist: The Movie, Doctor Who comic, How To Train Your Dragon 2, Kamen Rider Gaim, Tiger And Bunny: The Rising Show reports: MCM London Comic Con Film reviews: Edge Of Tomorrow, Cold In July, Maleficent, T.S. Spivet, X-Men: Days Of Future Past, Non-Stop, The Delivery Man, The Beast Within, I Declare War, Grace Of Monaco, Grindhouse Trailer Classics 4, Public Enemy: Welcome To The Terrordome Videogame reviews/previews: Tomodachi Life, Watch Dogs, Mario Kart 8, Shinji Mikami’s The Evil Within, Conception II, Super Time Force, Drakengard 3, Sportsfriends Anime and manga reviews: Tiger And Bunny: The Rising, Accel World, Aesthetica Of A Rogue Hero, Outlaw Star, Girls Und Panzer OVA Collection, Bleach Series 13 Part 2, Fairy Tail Collection 2, A Brief History Of Manga book, Attack On Titan: Colossal Edition 1, Cardfight!! Vanguard Volume 1, Millennium Snow Omnibus 1, Monster Soul Volume 1 Music: Girls' Generation, Gavin Harrison
Issue 26	May 2014 (Monster Special)	Features: Gareth Edwards' Godzilla, Godzilla Retrospective, Gamera Retrospective, Daimajin Retrospective, Spring Anime Round-up Show reports: Pokémon Grand Final Film and TV reviews: Godzilla, Robocop, Mood Indigo, Cheap Thrills, The Amazing Spider-Man 2, Willow Creek, Birth Of The Living Dead, The Truth About Emanuel, Transcendence, Koyaanisqatsi/Powaqqatsi, The Dirties Videogame reviews/previews: The Elder Scrolls Online, Final Fantasy XIV: A Realm Reborn, Demon Gaze, Etrian Odyssey Untold: The Millennium Girl, Kirby: Triple Deluxe, Mario Golf: World Tour, JoJo’s Bizarre Adventure: All Star Battle, Hometown Story Anime and manga reviews: Blue Exorcist: The Movie, Fate/Zero, Magi: The Labyrinth Of Magic, Dragon Ball, High School DxD, Ikki Tousen: Great Guardian, Princess Mononoke Blu-ray, Turning Point
Issue 25	April 2014 (Anime Special)	Features: Short Peace: Ranko Tsukigime’s Longest Day, The Amazing Spider-Man 2, Girls Und Panzer, Jonathan Clements’ Anime: A History, Patema Inverted, Hayao Miyazaki’s Flights Of Imagination Show reports: MCM Birmingham Comic Con Film and TV reviews: Locke, The Raid 2, The Hobbit: The Desolation Of Smaug, Arcade, Bad Channels, Frankenstein And The Monster From Hell, Hemlock Grove Videogame reviews/previews: Titanfall, inFamous: Second Son, Goat Simulator, Mario Kart 8, The Elder Scrolls Online, Murdered: Soul Suspect, Professor Layton Vs Phoenix Wright: Ace Attorney, Final Fantasy X/X-2 HD Remaster, The Witch And The Hundred Knight, MGS V: Ground Zeroes Anime and manga reviews: The Wind Rises, Patema Inverted, Fate/Zero, Chrome Shelled Regios, Girls Und Panzer, Guilty Crown, Hakuoki, Attack on Titan: Junior High, The Seven Deadly Sins, Stray Dog Of Anime Music: Interview with YouTube sensation Dan Bull, Pokémon Diamond & Pokémon Pearl: Super Music Collection, album of the month: Nanda Collection by Kyary Pamyu Pamyu
Issue 24	March 2014	Features: Yaiba: Ninja Gaiden Z, Captain America: The Winter Soldier, The Machine, Anime Mascot Mayhem, Durarara!! Show reports: Telford's MCM Midlands Comic Con Film reviews: The Muppets Most Wanted, 300: Rise Of An Empire, Ender’s Game, The Legend Of Hercules, Escape Plan, I Declare War, The Machine, Frankenstein: The True Story, Shady, Svengali, Salvo, Yurusarezaru Mono (Unforgiven), The Stuff Videogame reviews/previews: Dark Souls II, Tales Of Symphonia Chronicles, Ys: Memories Of Celceta, Atelier Escha And Logy: Alchemists Of The Dusk Sky, South Park: The Stick Of Truth, Thief, Senran Kagura Burst, Castlevania: Lords Of Shadow 2, Evolve Anime and manga reviews: The Mysterious Cities Of Gold Season 2, Tiger & Bunny: The Beginning, Blood-C: The Last Dark, Eureka Seven Ao Part 2, Sword Art Online Part 4, Dragon Ball GT – Season 2, Btooom!, Night Raid 1931, Hakuoki Season 2, Durarara!! Music: Interview with award-winning videogame, TV And film composer David Housden, Leave The World Behind film review, album of the month: Land by Yuzu
Issue 23	February 2014	Features: 300: Rise Of An Empire, Author Damian Dibben, Need For Speed, The Most Anticipated Horror Of 2014, Anime Winter Round-Up Show reports: The 61st Annual Toy Fair Film reviews: Thor 2, Mr. Peabody & Sherman, The Rocket, I Frankenstein, Bangkok Assassins, Leon, Robocop, Wake In Fright Videogame reviews/previews: Lightning Returns: Final Fantasy XIII, Sorcery Saga: Curse Of The Great Curry God, Toukiden: The Age Of Demons, Danganronpa: Trigger Happy Havoc, DragonBall Z: Battle Of Z, Jazzpunk, Octodad: Dadliest Catch, Dark Souls II, DayZ Anime and manga reviews: Magi: The Garden Of Words, Sword Art Online, The Labyrinth Of Magic, Dusk Maiden Of Amnesia, Colorful, Hakuoki, Infinite Stratos, Naruto Shippuden, Fairy Tail, One Piece, Bleach Music: Interview with Mancunian singer/songwriter Emma Hallows, album of the month: Monster by Girugamesh

== See also ==
- Empire magazine
- List of film periodicals
- List of manga magazines published outside of Japan
- Neo
- SFX
- Total Film
