= Pentel =

Japanese stationery company

Pentel Co., Ltd.

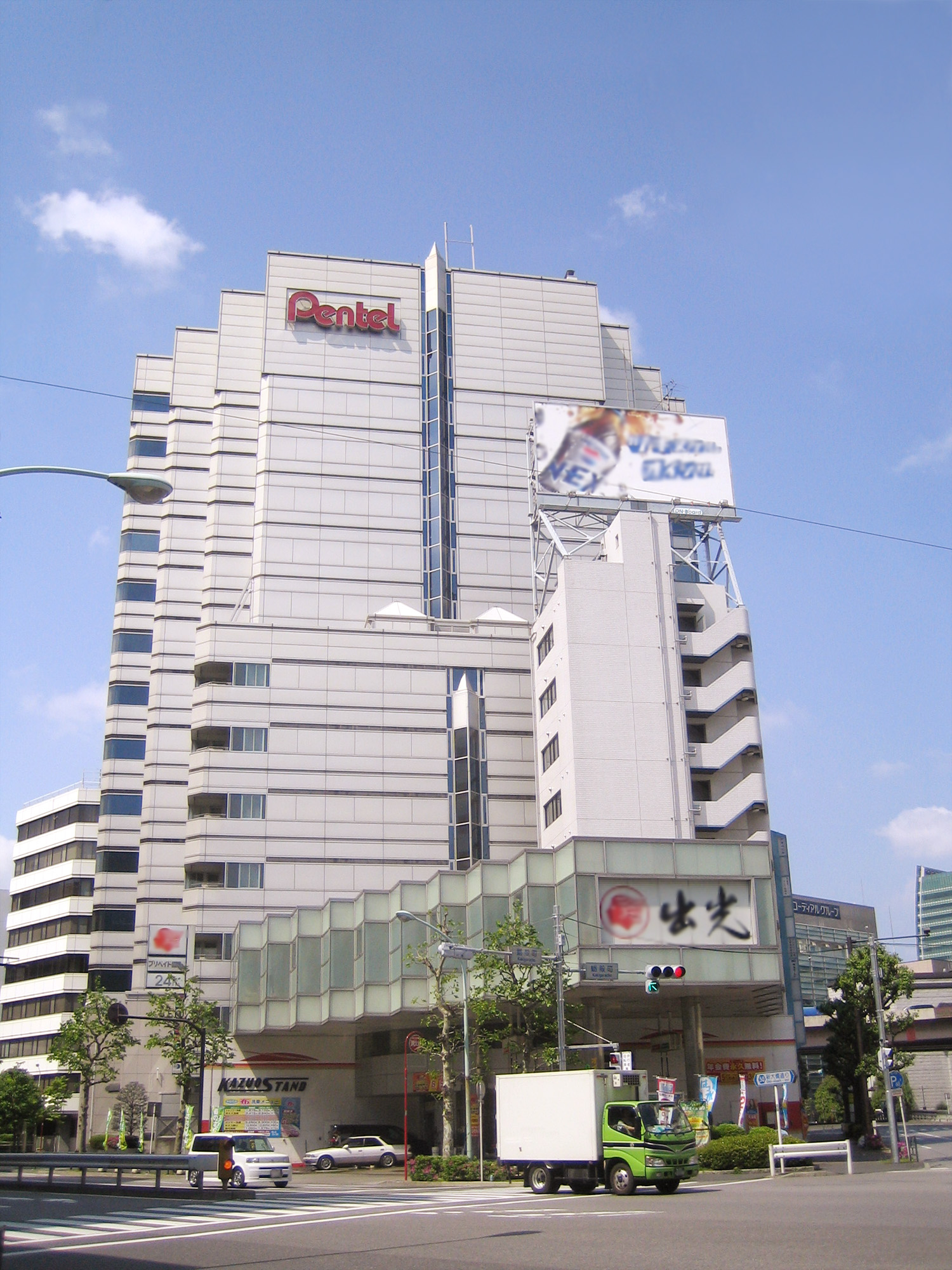
- Pentel headquarters in Tokyo, May 2006
- Formerly: Japan Stationery Co., Ltd. (1946–71)
- Type: Private K.K.
- Industry: Stationery (primary)
- Founded: 1946; 80 years ago
- Founder: Yukio Horie(President 1946–2010)
- Headquarters: Tokyo, Japan
- Area served: Worldwide
- Key people: Yu Wada (President and CEO)
- Products: Writing implements, art materials, office products, electronic devices and production equipment
- Number of employees: 773 (March 2012)
- Parent: Astrum Corporation
- Website: pentel.co.jp

Pentel Co., Ltd. (ぺんてる株式会社, Penteru Kabushiki Kaisha) is a privately held Japanese manufacturing company of stationery products. The company name was derived from the trademark used for one of their first widely known products, a portmanteau of the English words painting and pastel, but has since been interpreted as a combination of the words pen and tell (as in telling a story). Pentel is also the inventor of non-permanent marker technology. Most Pentel products are manufactured in Japan, Taiwan, Korea, Brazil, Mexico, and France.

The company is regarded as the inventor of the fibre-tipped (felt-tip) pen in 1962. Included in its innovations was its success in adapting traditional Japanese practice to industrial production. Nowadays, Pentel produces a wide range of products that include writing implements, art materials and office goods.

== History ==
After dissolving Horie Bunkaido, a Japanese wholesaler of Japanese traditional writing brushes established by his father, Yukio Horie, founded Pentel in 1946 in Tokyo as Dai Nippon Bungu Co., which later would become "Japan Stationery Limited" (Nihonbungu Kabushiki Kaisha). The goal was to manufacture crayons and pastels for use in education. The first products for sale were released in 1951, followed by pencils in 1960.

In 1963 Pentel launched the "Sign Pen", a fibre-type pen that was used by then President of the United States Lyndon B. Johnson, who bought a dozen of them to sign photographs, apart from being adopted as the official writing instrument of NASA and going into space with a Gemini mission in 1966. Demand for a Sign Pen was so extraordinary that the Tokyo factories could not supply all requests. The Sign Pen was one of Pentel's most successful products with more than two billion units sold.

In 1971 the company changed its name to "Pentel Co. Ltd." and one year later, the green rollerball pen with water-based ink, was launched. Horie remained as President of the company until his death in 2010.

In the 2010s, Pentel launched the "Pocket Brush", a fudepen that used replaceable waterproof ink cartridges, like fountain pens (and unlike conventional brush pens, which are more like marker pens.)

Brush pens (designed and recommended for calligraphy) have also gained popularity among comic book artists, who choose them to ink their works instead of dip pens or traditional brushes. One of those artists using Pentel was Neal Adams.

== Products ==
=== Stationery ===
Product lines include Sharp Kerry, Sharp P200 series, Multi 8 (All-purpose mechanical pencil), Twist-Erase, Q-Erase, Quicker Clicker, Graph 1000, Graphgear (500, 800 and 1000), Smash, Orenz, OrenzNero (mechanical pencils or "sharps"); Ain and Hi-Polymer (mechanical pencil leads, erasers); Energel (gel ink pens); Floatune, Vicuña (hybrid ink ballpoint pen); RSVP (oil-based ballpoint pens), Pentel Pen (permanent marker), and Sign Pen (fine tip marker).

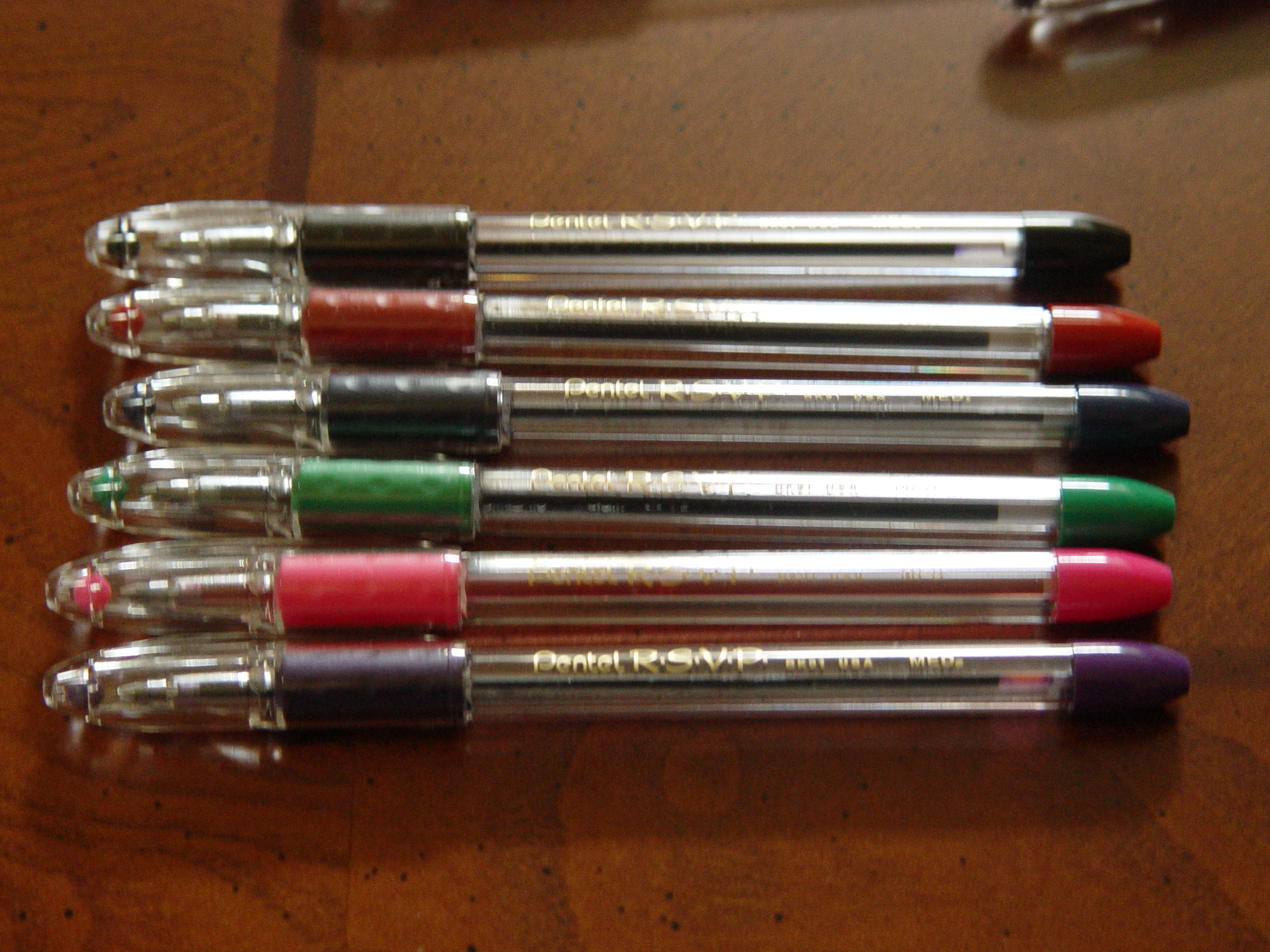
Pentel RSVP pens

Type	Products
Writing implements	Rollerball pens, gel pens, ballpoint pens, mechanical pencils, fountain pens, marker pens, highlighters, brush pens, pencils, colour pencils, refills
Art materials	Oil pastels, crayons, watercolors
Office supplies	Erasers, correction fluids, correction tapes, glues

=== Other products ===
Pentel produces and sells electronic devices and production equipment in addition to stationery.

- Electronic equipment – Touch panel, digitizer (liquid crystal pen tablet), touch switch, electronic pen (airpen)
- Production equipment – for industrial robots, industrial automatic assembly machines, precision dies for injection molding, precision hand presses
- OEM supply (OEM Division) – Cosmetic parts, stationery, office supplies, medical equipment
