= Dark Force =

Dark Force or Dark Forces may refer to:

== Star Wars ==
- The dark side of the Force
- Star Wars: Dark Forces, a 1995 video game and novelization
- Star Wars Jedi Knight: Dark Forces II, the sequel to the 1995 video game and novelization
- Dark Force, the Katana fleet, a fictional fleet in the Thrawn trilogy of Star Wars novels

== Entertainment ==
- Darkforce (Marvel Comics), a fictional cosmic force
- Dark Force, a character in the Phantasy Star video game series
- Dark Force (card game), a trading card game based on The Dark Eye
- Dark Forces (book), a 1981 horror anthology
- Dark Forces, or Harlequin, a 1980 Australian supernatural thriller
- Dark Forces (2020 film), a Mexican film

== See also ==
- Dark energy
- Dark flow
- Dark triad, a group of three "dark" personality traits
- Force (disambiguation)
- Dark (disambiguation)
- Dark Light (disambiguation)
