= Black Lamp =

Black Lamp may refer to:

- Black Lamp (video game), a 1988 platform game
- Black Lamp (revolutionary group), an early 19th-century British revolutionary organization
- Black Lamp, an alias of the DC Comics character Hop Harrigan

== See also ==
- Black light
- Lamp black
- Black Lantern
