= Sailor (pen company) =

Japanese pen manufacturer

Sailor Pen Company セーラー万年筆株式会社
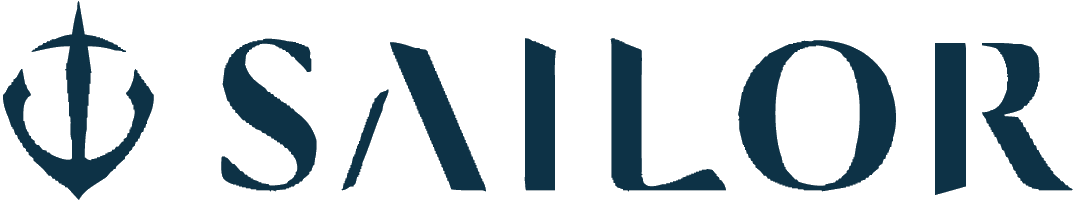

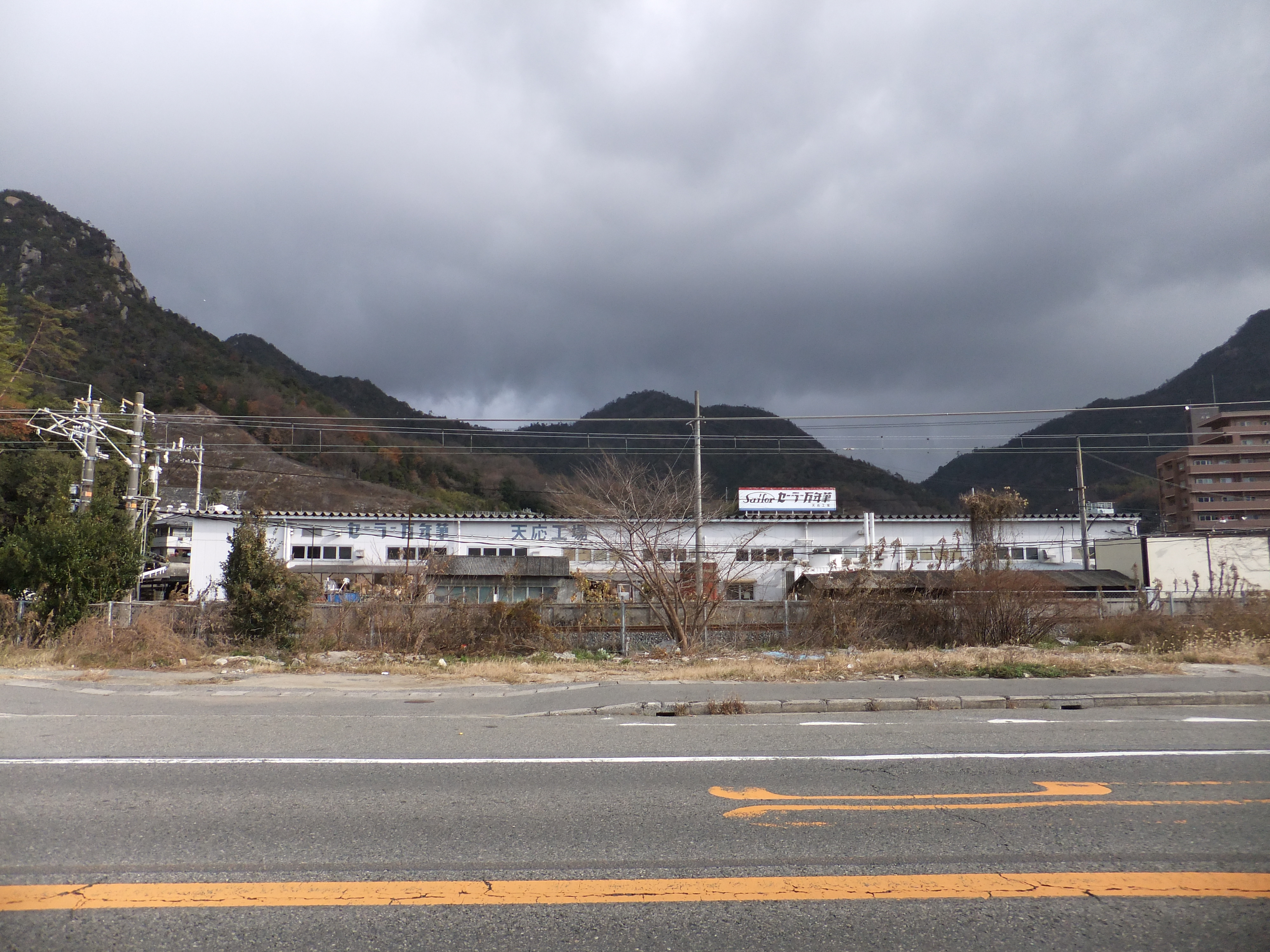
- Sailor headquarters in Kure, Hiroshima
- Formerly: Sakata-Manufactory
- Type: Public (K.K)
- Traded as: TYO: 79920
- Industry: Stationery
- Founded: 1911; 115 years ago
- Founder: Kyugoro Sakata
- Headquarters: Kure, Hiroshima, Japan
- Area served: Worldwide
- Products: Fountain pens, ballpoint pens, dip pens, inks, mechanical pencils
- Website: sailor.co.jp

The Sailor Pen Company is a Japanese pen manufacturer based in Kure, Hiroshima. It is famous for producing the first fountain pen in Japan with a gold nib, and the first in Japan for producing ballpoint pens.

Writing implements manufactured by Sailor include fountain pens, ballpoint pens, dip pens, inks, and mechanical pencils.

== History ==
In 1911, Sailor was founded by Kyugoro Sakata and his brother in Hiroshima as the "Sakata Manufactory", producing gold pen nibs. Kyugoro Sakata had been introduced to the fountain pen by a visiting British sailor, and this became the inspiration for the company name adopted a few years later.

The factory moved in 1917 to Hamadacho and changed its name to the “Sailor Pen Sakata-Manufactory Co., Ltd.”. The production of their fountain pens began here.

Their first ballpoint pens were produced in 1948. The first ink cartridges were invented by the firm in 1954, and made available to the public in 1958.

In the 1960s, Sailor launched a pen with 21K gold nibs, a world first. In 1963, the company introduced a handy, small pen with a cap clip that allowed the pen to be carried in a breast pocket or shirt pocket. The company also launched the first brush pen, a type of writing instrument derived from Japanese calligraphy brushes. In the 1970s, the pen market was in crisis. The company responded by launching a series of colourful pens for children called Candy in 1976, which turned out to be a success, as 15 million of this series were sold worldwide in 4 years. The Chalana series of pens also enjoyed large sales.

In 1981, Sailor launched the 1911 series of pens (known as Profit in Japan) the name of which referred to the year in which the company's history began.

In 1952 the head office moved from Kure, Hiroshima to Tokyo, but in April 2021 it was returned to Kure.

== Products ==
=== Fountain pens ===
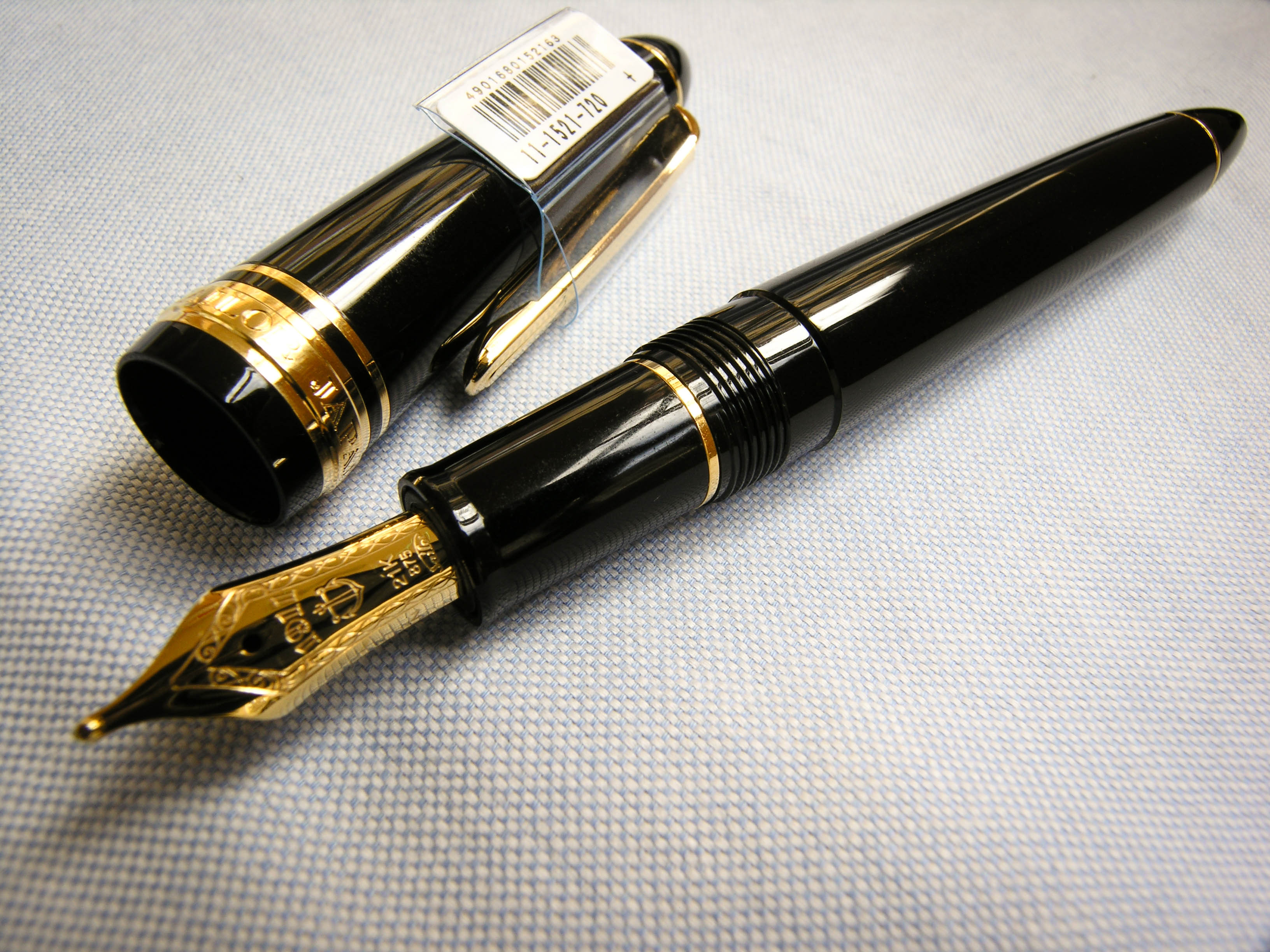
A Sailor 1911 with a 21 carat gold Zoom nib

The range of fountain pens includes:

- 1911. A rounded cigar shape, known as the Profit in Japan.
- Pro-gear.
- Compass. In two versions, the Compass 1911, and the Compass TUZU.

=== Ballpoint pens ===
The range of ballpoint pens includes:

- 1911
- Arita Yaki
- Cylint
- Shikiori
- Tuzu

=== Ink ===
Sailor produces several kinds of bottled ink for fountain pens, for example the regular line (previously called Jentle Ink), Shikiori, Manyo, Ink Studio.

Sailor also produces Dipton bottled ink exclusively for dip pens in various colours with Sheen and Shimmer finish.
