= Black Light (disambiguation) =

A blacklight is a lamp that emits mainly long-wave ultraviolet light (UV-A).

Black Light or Blacklight may also refer to:

== Arts, entertainment, and media ==
=== Comics ===
- Black Light (2000 AD), a science fiction thriller series published in the British comic anthology 2000 AD in 1996
- Blacklight (Fox Atomic Comics), a comic book and video game

=== Fictional characters ===
- Blacklight (Image Comics), two Image Comics characters
- Blacklight (MC2), a Marvel Comics character

=== Games ===
- Blacklight: Retribution, a 2012 online first-person shooter video game
- Blacklight: Tango Down, a 2010 first-person shooter video game

=== Music ===
- Blacklight (Iris album), 2010
- Blacklight (Tedashii album), 2011
- Black Light (Groove Armada album), a 2010 album by Groove Armada
- Black Light (John McLaughlin album), a 2015 album by John McLaughlin
- The Black Light (Calexico album), 1998
- The Black Light (The Ting Tings album), 2018
- "Black Lights", a song by Medina from Forever

=== Other uses in arts, entertainment, and media ===
- Black Light (novel), a 1996 Bob Lee Swagger novel by Stephen Hunter
- Black Light, a 2010 science-fiction novel by Indian writer Rimi B. Chatterjee
- Black Light, a play by Australian playwright and actor Jada Alberts, first performed 2026
- Blacklight (film), a 2022 American action thriller film, starring Liam Neeson

== Software ==
- Blacklight (software), or Project Blacklight, an information retrieval user interface software used by libraries and museums
- BlackLight, a rootkit detection utility from F-Secure

== Other uses ==
- BlackLight Power, a company founded by Randell L. Mills, who claims to have discovered a new energy source

== See also ==
- Backlighting (lighting design), a technique for photography or the stage
- Backlight, a form of illumination used in liquid crystal displays (LCDs)
- Black Lamp (disambiguation)
- Black Lantern
- Dark Light (disambiguation)
