= Dark Light =

Dark Light or Darklight may refer to:

== Literature ==
- Dark Light (novel), a 2002 novel by Ken MacLeod
- Dark Light, a 2008 novel by Jayne Castle
- Darklight, a follow-up novel to Wondrous Strange by Lesley Livingston
- The Dark Light, a 1998 novel by Mette Newth
- The Dark Light, a 2012 novel by Sara Walsh
- Dark Light, a 2006 novel by Randy Wayne White

== Film and television ==
- The Dark Light (film), a 1951 Hammer Film Productions thriller
- Darklight (film), a 2004 TV fantasy thriller
- "The Dark Light" (Yu-Gi-Oh! GX), an episode of Yu-Gi-Oh! GX
- Darklight Film Festival

== Music ==
- Darklight, a solo project of Kátai Tamás

=== Albums ===
- Dark Light (East 17 album)
- Dark Light (HIM album) (2005)
- Dark Light (Gary Numan album)
- A Dark Light, a 2002 album by Waterson–Carthy

=== Songs ===
- "Dark Light", a song by KISS from Music from "The Elder"

== Other uses ==
- Dark light (vision) or eigengrau, the color seen by the eye in perfect darkness
- Dark light, a theoretical force that only interacts with dark matter
- Darklight Conflict, a computer game
- CyberMage: Darklight Awakening, a computer game
- The Dark Light Device from Luigi's Mansion Dark Moon, and Luigi's Mansion 3

== See also ==
- Black Light (disambiguation)
- Darclight, a film production company
- Dark energy, a proposed form of energy that affects the universe on the largest scales
- Dark Force (disambiguation)
- Darklighter (disambiguation)
- Dark photon
