= Fudepen =

Cartridge-based writing implement

Fudepen (筆ペン)
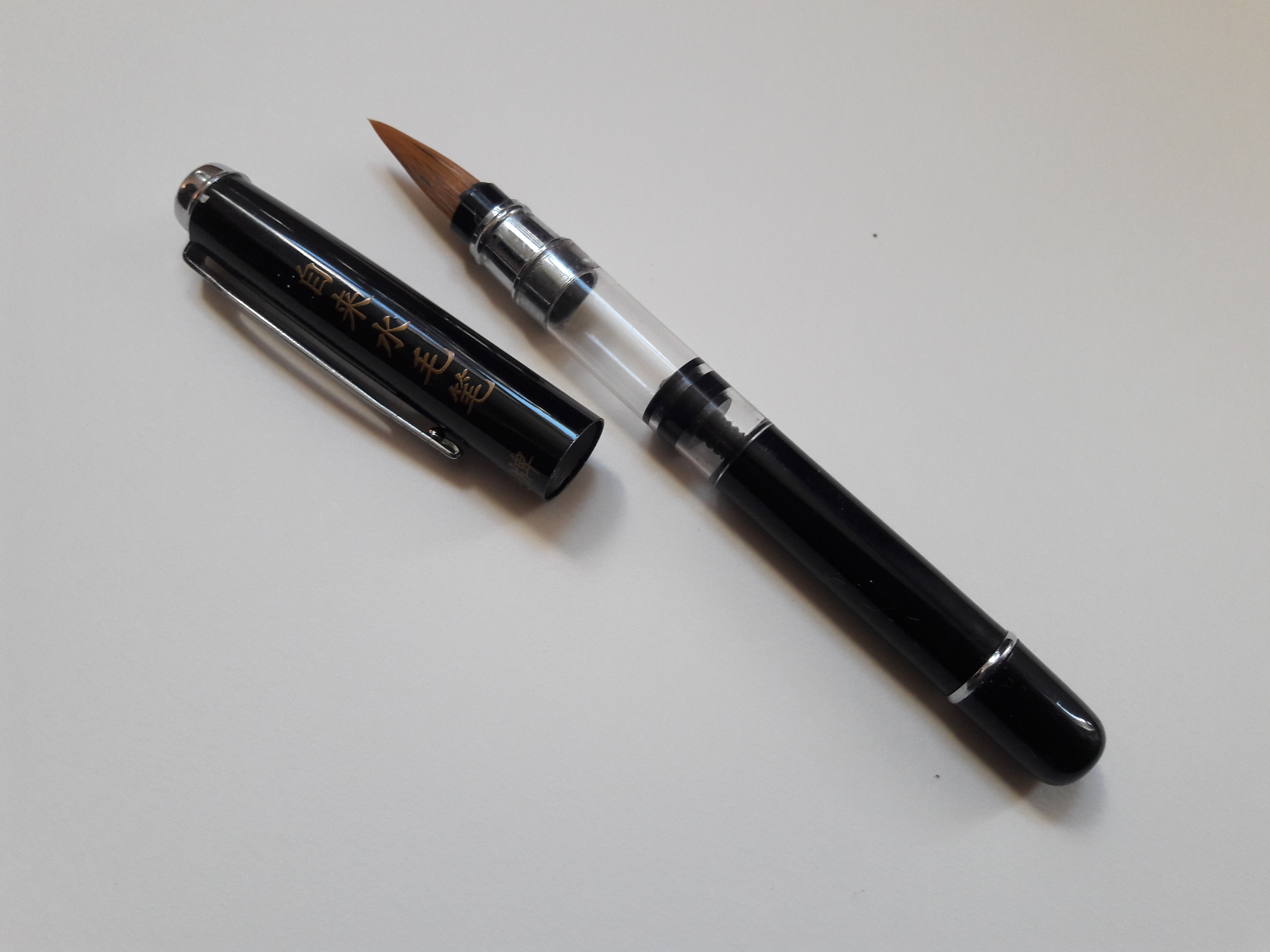
- Refillable brush-pen with natural hair
- Type: Pen
- Inventor: Sailor Pen Co.
- Inception: 1972; 54 years ago
- Manufacturer: Kuretake; Pentel
- Available: Yes

A fudepen (筆ペン), also known as a brush pen, is a cartridge-based writing implement used in East Asian calligraphy.

== Overview ==
The fudepen was invented by Sailor Fountain Pen Co. Ltd. in 1972, but Kuretake Co. Ltd. made it commercially successful with their release in 1973. Kuretake developed their fudepen through the application of felt-tip pen technology, after plans to export felt-tip pens were disrupted by the sudden appreciation of Japanese Yen due to the Nixon Shock.

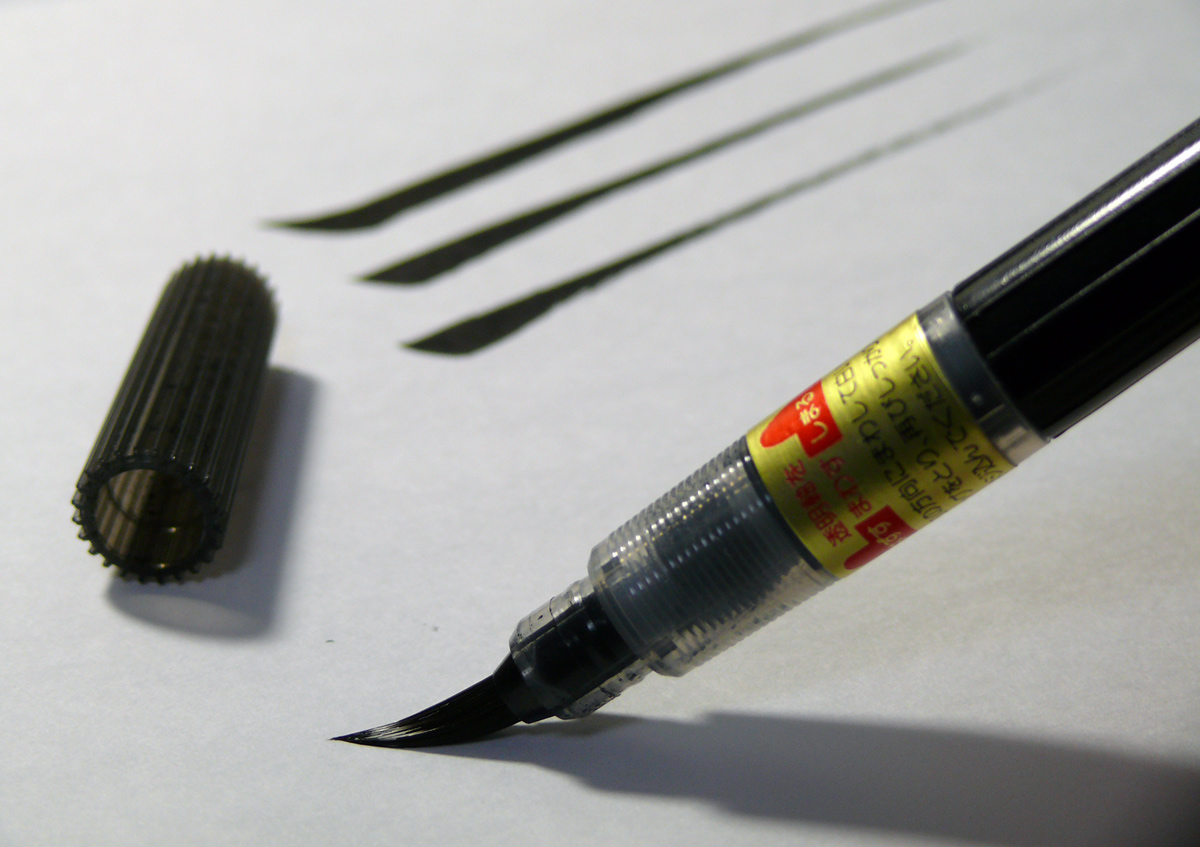
Brush pen strokes

Meanwhile, Pentel, the original manufacturer of felt-tip pens, introduced their own fudepen in 1976, and became one of the earliest brands to adopt proper nylon bristles. Pentel would introduce the 'Pocket Brush' in 2010 as a pocket-safe alternative to their beloved fudepen. The 'Pocket Brush' used replaceable waterproof ink cartridges in a similar vein to fountain pens. The size of the 'Pocket Brush' eventually became the de-facto standard for all fudepens that followed it.

Fudepens (designed and recommended for calligraphy) have also gained popularity among comic book artists, who choose them to ink their works instead of dip pens or traditional brushes. One of those artists using a fudepen (specifically a Pentel one) was the American comic book artist Neal Adams.

Another two Japanese brands, Sakura and Tombow, manufacture and sell brush-tip markers, named "brush pens" by themselves, although unlike Pentel or Kuretake products, Sakura's and Tombow's don't use the same type of ink and do not use refillable cartridges.
