= Pyranine =

Names
- IUPAC name Trisodium 8-hydroxypyrene-1,3,6-trisulfonate
- Other names 8-Hydroxypyrene-1,3,6-trisulfonic acid; Solvent Green 7; HPTS; Sulfonated hydroxy pyrene trisodium salt

Identifiers
CAS Number	6358-69-6
3D model (JSmol)	Interactive image
Beilstein Reference	4107272
ChEBI	CHEBI:52083
ChemSpider	55317
ECHA InfoCard	100.026.166
EC Number	228-783-6
PubChem CID	4136521
UNII	I2W85YOX9L
CompTox Dashboard (EPA)	DTXSID4041739
- InChI: InChI=1S/C16H10O10S3.3Na/c17-11-5-12(27(18,19)20)8-3-4-10-14(29(24,25)26)6-13(28(21,22)23)9-2-1-7(11)15(8)16(9)10;;;/h1-6,17H,(H,18,19,20)(H,21,22,23)(H,24,25,26);;;/q;3*+1/p-3 Key: KXXXUIKPSVVSAW-UHFFFAOYSA-K
- SMILES: C1=CC2=C3C(=C(C=C2S(=O)(=O)[O-])S(=O)(=O)[O-])C=CC4=C(C=C(C1=C43)O)S(=O)(=O)[O-].[Na+].[Na+].[Na+]

Properties
Chemical formula	C_{16}H_{7}Na_{3}O_{10}S_{3}
Molar mass	524.37 g·mol^{−1}
Appearance	Yellow-green crystalline powder
Solubility in water	Soluble

Hazards
- GHS labelling
Pictograms	(GHS07: Exclamation mark)
Signal word	Warning
Hazard statements	H315, H319, H335
- Except where otherwise noted, data are given for materials in their standard state (at 25 °C [77 °F], 100 kPa). verify (what is ?) Infobox references

Pyranine is a hydrophilic, pH-sensitive fluorescent dye from the group of chemicals known as arylsulfonates. Pyranine is soluble in water and is used as a coloring agent, biological stain, optical detecting reagent, and pH indicator. Pyranine is also used in yellow highlighters to provide their characteristic fluorescence and bright yellow-green colour. It is also found in some types of soap.

== Synthesis ==
Pyranine is synthesized from pyrenetetrasulfonic acid and a solution of sodium hydroxide in water under reflux. The trisodium salt crystallizes as yellow needles when adding an aqueous solution of sodium chloride.

== See also ==
- Fluorescein
- Fluorescence
