= Black Lamp (revolutionary group) =

The Black Lamp was a secret and illegal working class revolutionary group that existed during the early 19th century in Yorkshire.

Little documentary evidence of the group's activities survives, and historians have disputed those details that do remain. One of the most influential accounts of the group comes from historian Edward Thompson, who construed the organization as integral to the birth of British working-class consciousness. Others, including J.R. Dinwiddy, have argued that Thompson may have been entirely mistaken in theorizing a revolutionary tradition in contemporary Yorkshire, claiming that the group may not have existed at all. The very name, some have asserted, may be a misreading of the description "Black Lump". Some have asserted that the organization coalesced around economic rather than political interests; historian Richard Brown concludes that both factors are likely to have played a part.

== See also ==
- Edward Despard
- Luddism
