= Pencil extender =

Device to extend small pencils

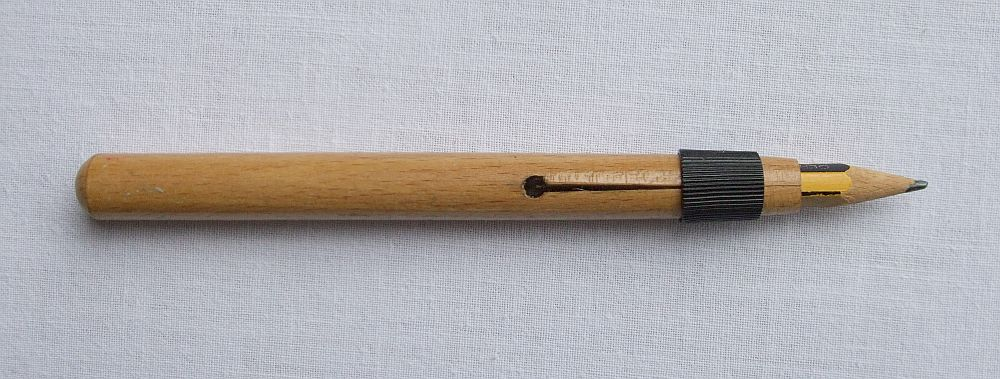
A wooden pencil extender.

A pencil extender (or pencil lengthener) is a small instrument (made out of metal or wood) allowing to extend small pencils, in order to facilitate their use.

== History ==
The pencil extender dates back to at least 1879, when Joseph Reckendorfer patented a "pencil holders which [is] provided with movable jaws". Ever more efficient means of mass production of pencils has driven the replacement cost of a pencil down. Before this, people would continue to use the stub of a pencil to delay the cost of a new one. For those who "did not feel comfortable using a stub, pencil extenders were sold. These devices function something like a porte-crayon [...] the pencil stub can be inserted into the end of a shaft [...] Extenders were especially common among engineers and draftsmen, whose favorite pencils were prized dearly. The use of an extender also has the advantage that the pencil does not appreciably change its heft as it wears down." Artists currently use extenders to maximize the use of their colored pencils.

== Production ==
Several companies still produce this kind of object, including Caran d'Ache, Faber-Castell, Koh-i-Noor Hardtmuth, General Pencil Company, Inc., and the Derwent Cumberland Pencil Company.
