= Writing implement =

Tool used for writing

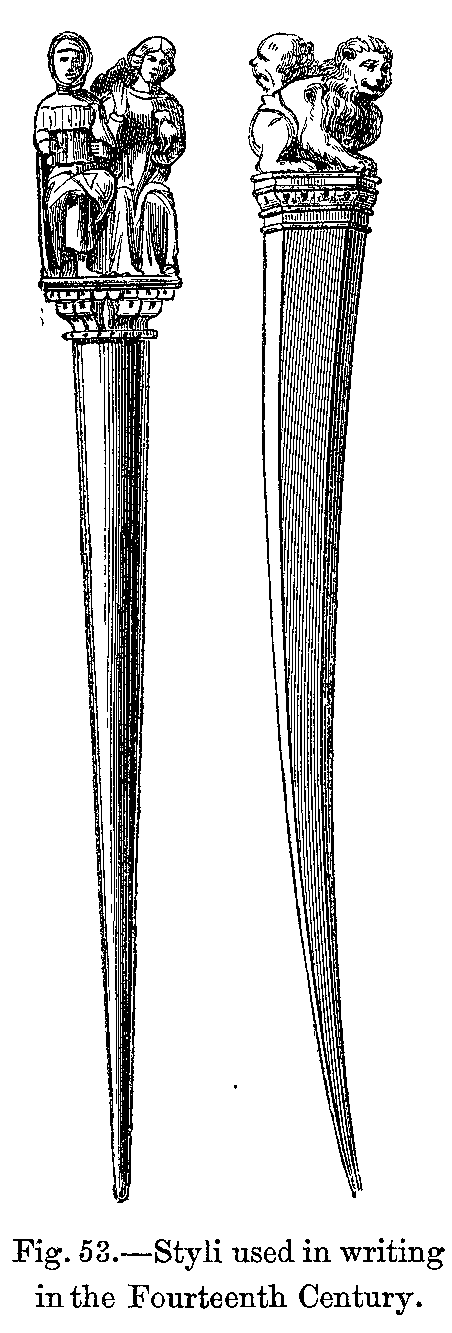
Styli used in writing in the fourteenth century

A writing implement or writing instrument is an object used to produce writing. Writing consists of different figures, lines, and or forms. Most of these items can be also used for other functions such as painting, drawing and technical drawing, but writing instruments generally have the ordinary requirement to create a smooth, controllable line.

Another writing implement employed by a smaller population is the stylus used in conjunction with the slate for punching out the dots in Braille.

== Autonomous ==
An autonomous writing implement is one that cannot "run out"—the only way to render it useless is to destroy it.

=== Without pigment ===
The oldest known examples were created by incising a flat surface with a rigid tool rather than applying pigment with a secondary object, e.g., Chinese jiaguwen carved into turtle shells. However, this may simply represent the relative durability of such artifacts rather than truly representing the evolution of techniques, as the meaningful application of pigment is attested in prehistoric cave paintings such as the ones at Lascaux.

The ancient Sumerians and their successor cultures, such as the Babylonians, produced their cuneiform writing by pressing a triangular stylus into soft clay tablets, creating characteristic wedge-shaped marks. The clay tablets were then baked to harden them and permanently preserve the marks.

Several other ancient cultures such as Mycenaean Greece also inscribed their records into clay tablets but did not routinely bake them; much of the Linear B corpus from Minoan Crete was accidentally preserved by a catastrophic fire which hard-baked those tablets. The Romans used lead styli with wax tablets which could be "erased" by rubbing the beeswax surface smooth again.

In the modern era, hand held computers and certain other computer input devices use a stylus to enter information onto a screen by applying pressure rather than by depositing pigment.

Words and names are still commonly inscribed into commemorative objects, such as the engraved winners' names on the silver Stanley Cup or the Gettysburg Address carved into the stone wall of the Lincoln Memorial, but the requisite tools are not exclusively considered to be writing instruments.

=== With inherent pigment ===
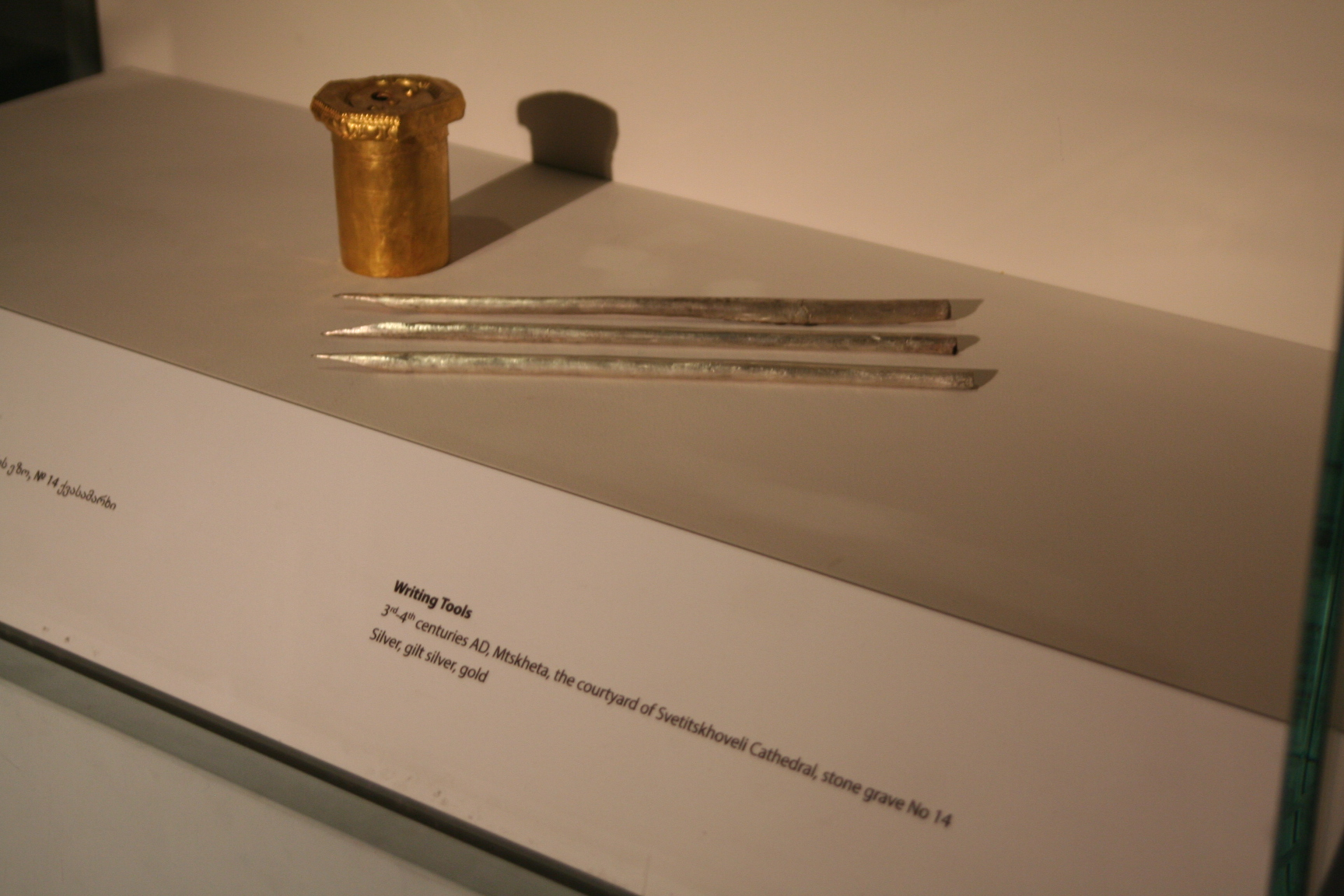
The 3rd-4th-century writing implements from Mtskheta, Georgia.

The original form of "lead pencil" was the leaden stylus used by the ancient Romans, who also used it to write on wood or papyrus by leaving dark streaks where the soft metal rubbed off onto the surface.

The concept has been revived in recent times as the core of the inkless pen: a lead-based metal alloy that leaves dark markings on paper by abrading small pieces of core onto the surface.

However, most modern "lead pencils" have a nonpoisonous core of greyish-black graphite mixed with various proportions of clay for consistency, enclosed within an outer wooden casing to protect the fragile graphite from being snapped apart or from leaving marks on the user's hand.

White chalk has been traditionally used in schoolrooms to write on a main blackboard at the front of the room. In the 19th century, and indeed well into the 20th century, when paper was less readily available, individual students also wrote with chalk on their own small slates.

Both pencils and chalk exist in variants which can create marks in other colors, but colored pencils and colored chalk are generally considered to be art supplies rather than writing instruments. Similarly, although very young children may use colorful wax crayons to write words into their pictures, writing is not considered to be the primary use of crayons.

A wax pencil resembles both a crayon and a pencil in that it contains a brightly colored wax core within a protective paper casing, but its proportions are closer to that of a standard pencil. Wax pencils are primarily used to write onto nonporous surfaces such as porcelain or glass.

Normal pencils, chalk, and crayons all share the characteristic that they cannot "run out". The useful life of these implements is closely linked to their physical existence. However, specialized accessories such as pencil sharpeners may be required to reshape the working end of the pigment core or to remove the outer casing from around the tip.

== Assisted ==
These require the presence of an added pigment in order to write, and are useless when "empty".

=== Pens ===
The pen is the most common form of writing implement. It has a hard tip which applies ink to a surface.

==== Capillary-action dip pens ====
Initially, pens were made by slicing a suitable nib point from the end of a thin, hollow natural material which could retain a small reservoir of ink by capillary action. However, these ink reservoirs were relatively small, requiring the pen to be periodically dipped back into an external inkwell for replenishing.

Reed pens were used by the ancient Egyptians to write on papyrus. Quill pens were standard in Europe and the United States up through the 18th and 19th centuries, and are still used in various contexts, such as calligraphy and formal settings such as major bank transactions. The most common quills were taken from the wings of geese or ravens, although the feathers of swans and peacocks were sometimes favored for prestige.

A dip pen has a steel nib (the pen proper) and a pen-holder. Dip pens are very versatile, as the pen-holder can accommodate a wide variety of nibs that are specialized for different purposes: copperplate writing, mapping pens, and five-pointed nibs for drawing music staves. They can be used with most types of ink, some of which are incompatible with other types of pen. Automatic pens are a category of dip pen, in which the nib is in two parts and can hold a larger quantity of ink. However, like all of its precursors, the steel-nibbed dip pens had a limited ink reservoir and a tendency to drip inkblots on the page.

==== Fountain pens ====
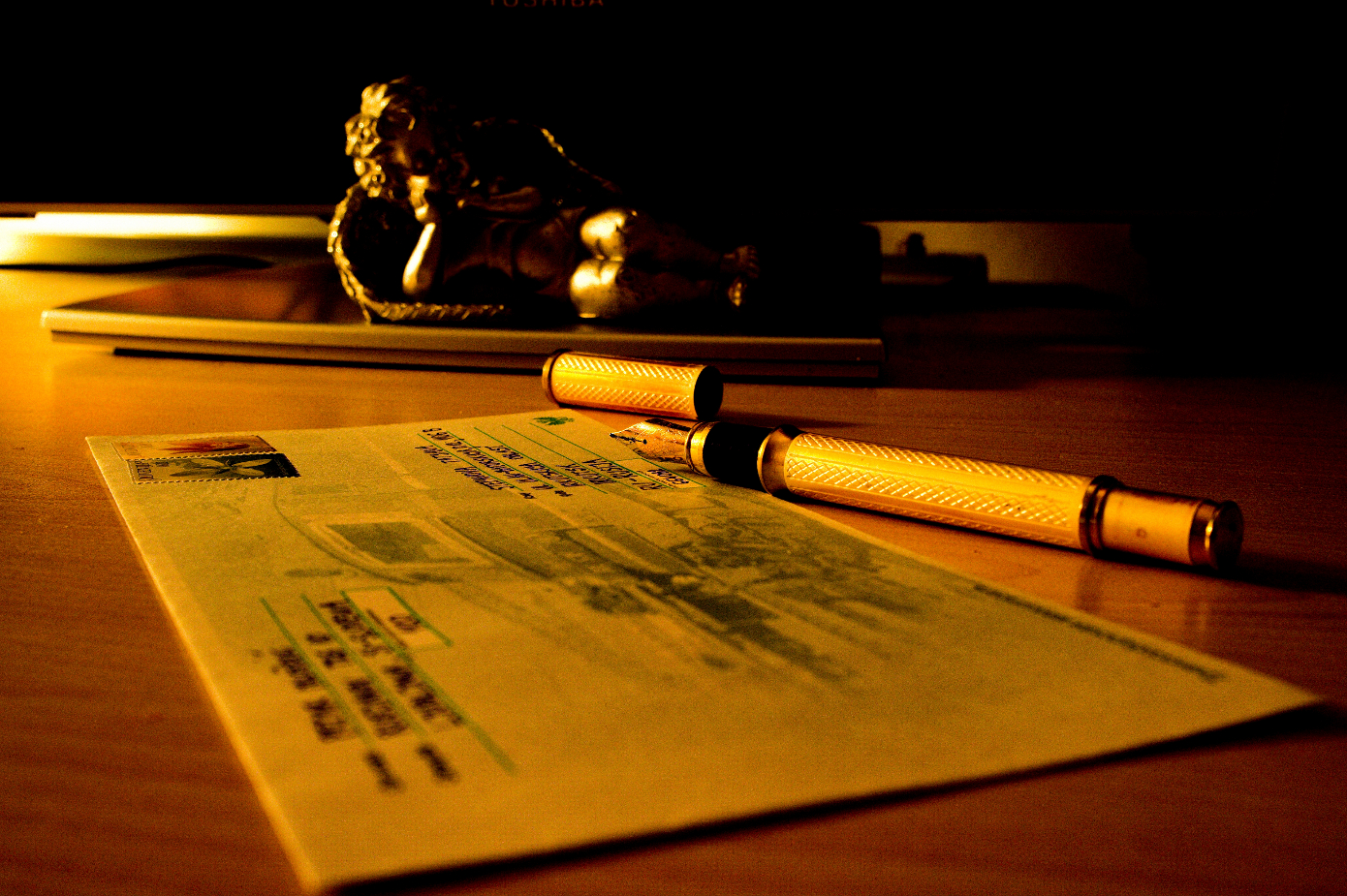
A letter written with fountain pen.

The first modern fountain pens were developed in the 19th century, with functionally similar designs appearing as early as the 10th century. These consist of the nib unit, an ink reservoir chamber, and an external casing. The casing usually includes a cover for the nib, in order to protect its shape and keep the ink from evaporating dry or wicking into the user's pocket. Depending on the design of the pen, the ink reservoir can be filled in several different ways: direct addition by eyedropper, suction from an internal mechanism, or disposable pre-filled cartridges. Some cartridge-based fountain pens can be fitted with "converters", which are separate piston/suction reservoirs of the same dimensions as the pen's usual refill cartridge; these allow the pen to refill from bottled ink.

Only certain types of ink can be used in a fountain pen, to avoid clogging up the nib unit mechanism. Although the larger reservoir of fountain pens requires less frequent ink replenishment, the ink may inconveniently spill out in certain contexts to stain the paper, fingers, or clothing of an unwary writer. Differences in air pressure may cause the ink to leak when travelling by airplane.

==== Disposable pens ====
A large number of new pen types were popularized in the 20th century. Some of them are not constructed to be refilled with ink after they run dry; although others can theoretically have their internal ink compartment replaced, the widespread custom is to simply throw away the entire pen when its ink is no longer accessible.

These types include the ballpoint pen (often called a biro in many Commonwealth countries) and the felt tip pen. Both of these have subtypes which are popularly called by their own specific names, usually based on the type of their ink, such as the fluorescent highlighter, the rollerball pen, and the gel pen.

=== Mechanical pencils ===
Unlike the construction of a traditional wooden pencil around a solid graphite core, a mechanical pencil feeds a small, mobile piece of graphite through its tip. An internal mechanism controls the position of the graphite by friction, so that although it remains steady while writing, the graphite can be advanced forward to compensate for gradual wear or retracted to protect it when not in use. The graphite in mechanical pencils is typically much narrower than in wooden pencils, frequently in sub-millimeter diameters. This makes them particularly useful for fine diagrams or small handwriting, although different sizes of refill leads cannot be interchanged in the same pencil unless it has been specially designed for that purpose.

=== Brushes ===
Although in Western civilization writing is usually done with some form of pencil or pen, other cultures have used other instruments. Chinese characters are traditionally written with a brush, which is perceived as lending itself to a graceful, flowing stroke.

A brush differs from a pen in that instead of a rigid nib, the brush is tipped with soft bristles. The bristles are gently swept across the paper with just enough pressure to allow ink to wick onto the surface, rather than mashing down the brush to the extent of substantial friction resistance. Although pens with semi-flexible nibs and liquid ink can also vary their stroke width depending on the degree of applied pressure, their variation range is far less obvious.

Traditionally, brushes have been loaded with ink by dipping the bristles into an external pool of ink on an inkstone, analogous to a traditional dip pen with an inkwell. Some companies now make "brush pens" which in that regard resemble a fountain pen, with an internal ink reservoir built into the handle which can be refilled with preloaded cartridges or a bottle-fill converter.

== Accessories ==
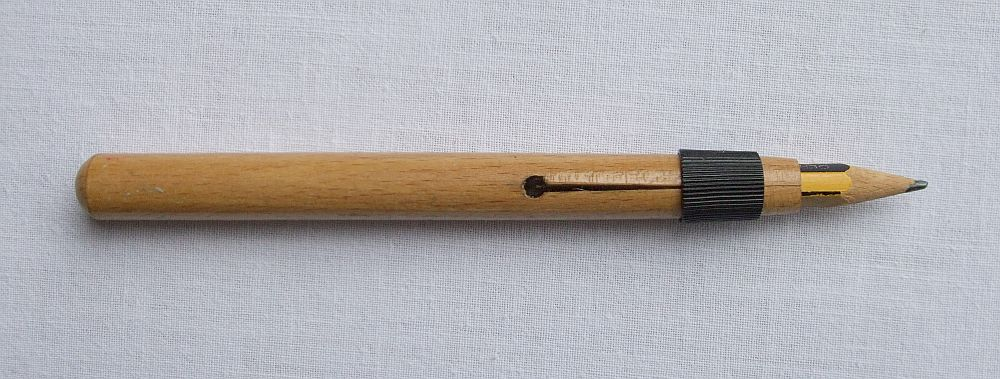
A wooden pencil extender

Other implements indirectly associated with writing include erasers for pen and pencil, pencil sharpeners, pencil extenders, inkwells, blotter paper, and rulers and related drawing instruments. Pounce pots were a precursor of blotting paper, being a dispenser for powdery material for drying the paper. Stencils can be used to create standardised letters, patterns or signatures. There are also pencil sharpeners that can exclusively be used with wooden pencils.

== See also ==
- List of pen types, brands and companies
- Writing in space
- Writing material
