= Highlighter =

Type of writing device

A highlighter, also called a fluorescent pen, is a type of writing device used to bring attention to sections of text by marking them with a vivid, translucent colour. A typical highlighter is fluorescent yellow, with the colour coming from pyranine. Different compounds, such as rhodamines (Rhodamine 6GD, Rhodamine B) are used for other colours.

== History ==
A highlighter is a felt-tip marker filled with transparent fluorescent ink instead of black or opaque ink. The first highlighter was invented by Dr. Frank Honn in 1963 and produced by Carter's Ink Company, using the trademarked name Hi-Liter. Avery Dennison Corporation now owns the brand, having acquired Carter's in 1975.

== Styles ==
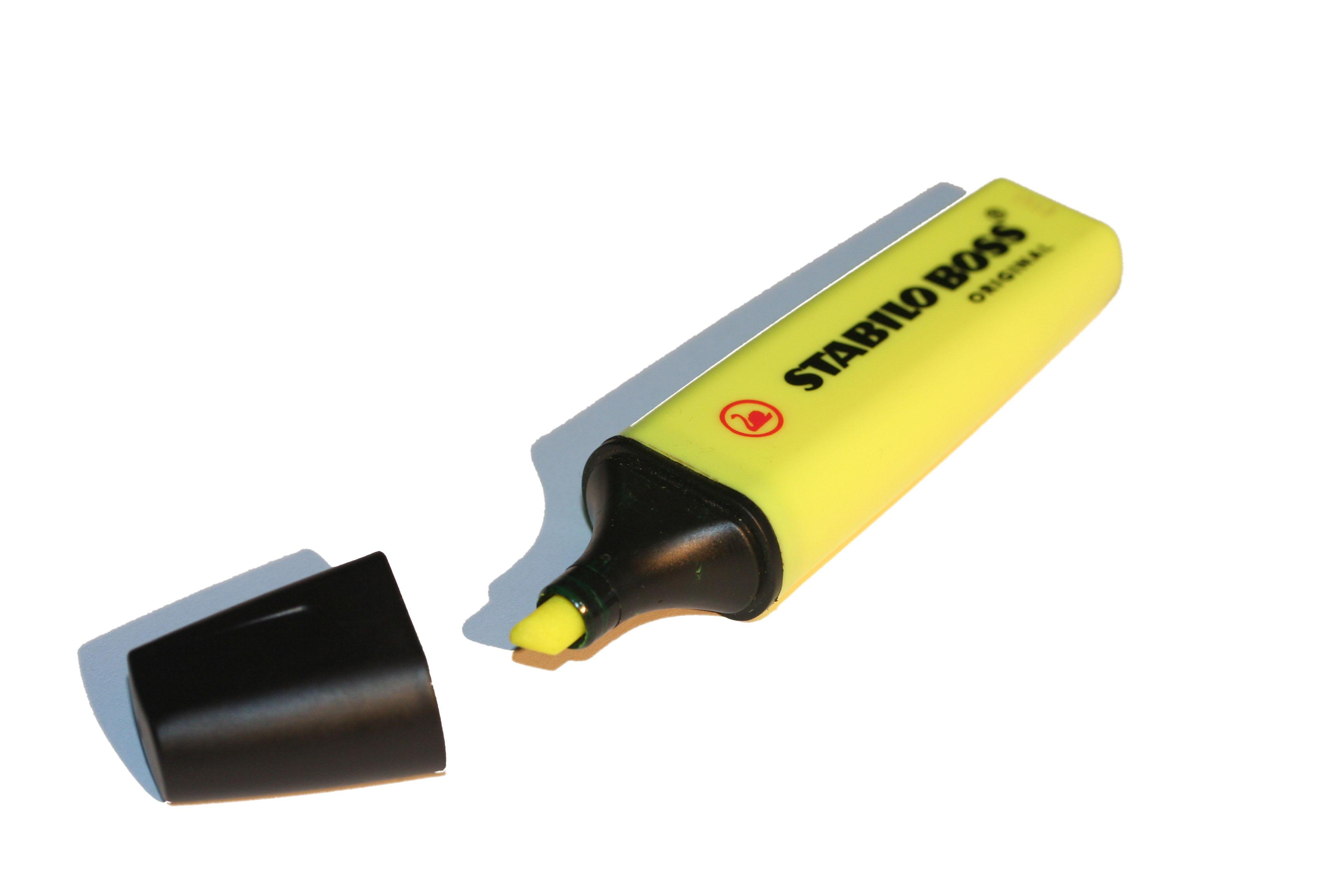
A yellow Stabilo-brand highlighter marker

Many highlighters come in bright, often fluorescent and vibrant colours. Being fluorescent, highlighter ink glows under black light. The most common colour for highlighters is yellow, but they are also found in orange, red, pink, purple, blue, and green varieties. Some yellow highlighters may look greenish in colour to the naked eye. Yellow is the preferred colour to use when making a photocopy as it will not produce a shadow on the copy.

Highlighters are available in multiple forms, including some that have a retractable felt tip or an eraser on the end opposite the felt. Other types of highlighters include the trilighter, a triangularly-shaped pen with a different-coloured tip at each corner, and ones that are stackable. There are also some forms of highlighters that have a wax-like quality similar to an oil pastel.

"Dry highlighters" (occasionally called "dry line highlighters") have an applicator that applies a thin strip of highlighter tape (physically similar to audio tape or correction tape) instead of a felt tip. Unlike standard highlighters, they are easily erasable. They are different from "dry mark highlighters", which are sometimes advertised as being useful for highlighting books with thin pages.

"Gel highlighters" contain a gel stick rather than a felt tip. The gel does not bleed through paper or become dried out in the pen as other highlighters' inks may, which renders them useless.

"Liquid highlighters" in a range of colours are also available, and because they put more ink on a page when highlighting, they make words stand out more than with non-liquid types. Also the fact that more highlighting ink is put on the page with liquid highlighters means that the highlighting ink is much more resistive to fading with age.

"Pastel highlighters" use pastel dyes instead of fluorescent dyes.

== In software ==
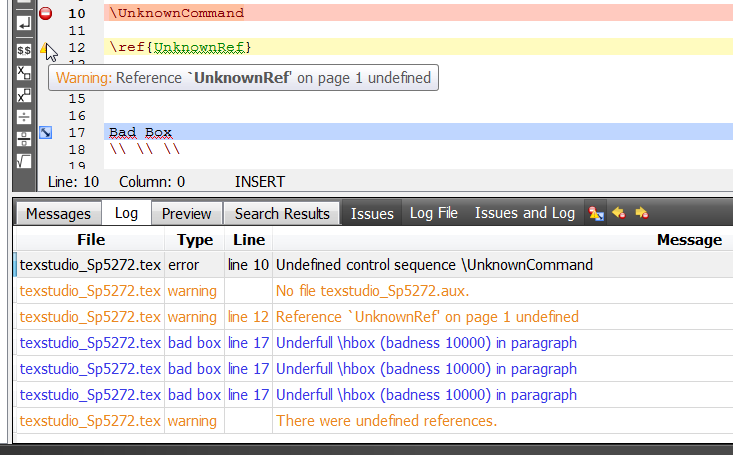
Errors marked in computer code, in the style of a highlighter pen

Some word processing software can simulate highlighting by using a technique similar to reverse video on some terminals. For example, the CHAR command of Commodore 128 BASIC allows text to be displayed in reverse, which can be used to highlight text forms and selected items in menus.

In HTML, text can be highlighted in yellow with the <mark> element. This is an example.

Some forms of syntax highlighting may also be displayed in the style of a highlighter pen, with a bright or pastel background to the text. Some web browser extensions also enable users to create digital highlights on websites and online PDFs.

== See also ==
- Emphasis (typography)
- Sanitization (classified information)—using black "highlighter" to hide classified information.
