= Utrecht Art Supplies =

Art supply store chain in New York City

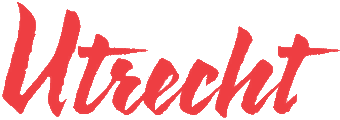
- Type: Subsidiary
- Industry: Art materials, office supplies
- Founded: 1949; 77 years ago in New York City
- Founder: Norman Gulamerian; Harold Gulamerian
- Fate: Acquired and merged to Blick Art Materials
- Headquarters: Brooklyn, U.S.
- Number of locations: 45
- Brands: List: Utrech; Caran d'Ache; Derwent; edding; Faber-Castell; Grumbacher; Koh-i-Noor; Prismacolor; Pentel; Royal Talens; Rotring; Sakura; Sennelier; Sharpie; Staedtler; Winsor & Newton
- Parent: Blick Art Materials
- Website: utrechtart.com

Utrecht Art Supplies is an art materials manufacturing and chain store company, based in Brooklyn. Utrecht, founded in 1949 in New York City by artist Norman Gulamerian and his brother Harold Gulamerian, sells a large range of art material brands including its own line of products. Art materials produced by Utrecht include acrylics, watercolor, oils, brushes In 2013, Utrecht was acquired by Dick Blick, one of the chain's largest competitors. As a result, Dick Blick became "Blick Art Materials". Products sold at Utrecht stores include acrylic, oil, watercolor, brushes, canvas, papers, pencils, inks. Utrecht art supply also sells office supplies such as adhesives, paper clips, push pins, and others.

== History ==
Norman and Harold Gulamerian were born in Brooklyn, New York to Armenian immigrants. Harold Gulamerian was born in 1924 at the home of his parents who lived on 77th street in Bensonhurst. Norman Gulamerian was born at Lutheran Medical Center in 1927. Harold joined the army in 1943. As a senior at The High School of Music and Art, Norman enlisted in the Navy in 1945. After the war, Norman got his high school diploma and then went to Brooklyn College. Harold went to City College getting a degree in science and business administration and then a law degree. When Norman got home from the service he apprenticed himself to the artist Frederick Taubes (1900-1981). He primed Taubes' canvas and ground his paint. Norman, an artist himself, was having trouble finding unprimed linen. Harold suggested they import it from Belgium. That was the start of Utrecht Art Supplies. They sold their Belgian linen out of their basement in Brooklyn. The two brothers named their venture Utrecht Linens, Inc. and dedicated themselves to supplying artists with the "highest quality art materials and supplies for the best value." The Gulamerian brothers' artist supply business grew quickly. In 1957, they developed their revolutionary acrylic gesso for priming artist canvas. By the end of the early 1960s, they had expanded the Utrecht line to include professional-grade artist oil paints, acrylics, and watercolor supplies, sold at manufacturer-direct prices. In 1951, they rented an office at 119 West 57th Street. In 1958, they rented factory space at Bush Terminal in Brooklyn, New York. In 1968, they opened their first retail store at 32 Third Avenue in New York City. They then opened locations in Philadelphia, Boston, Chicago, Detroit, Washington DC, Berkeley, California, and San Francisco. By the time they sold their business in 1997, they had grown from a small space in Bush Terminal (now called Industry City) to 50,000 square feet and an additional 50,000 square feet of retail space. Norman Gulamerian died at 92 in April 2020 of coronavirus. Harold Gulamerian lived in Mill Neck on Long Island until his passing on September 5, 2012 at the age of 88. Today, Utrecht still mills its own premium artist paints and gesso at its Brooklyn, New York plant. Under its Brooklyn Made program, the Brooklyn Chamber of Commerce, has granted Utrecht Gold Certification status. This program affirms Utrecht as a locally based manufacturer and employer.

== Brands ==
Some of the brands commercialised by Utrecht include:

- Utrecht
- Caran d'Ache
- Derwent
- edding
- Faber-Castell
- Grumbacher
- Koh-i-Noor
- Prismacolor
- Pentel
- Royal Talens
- Rotring
- Sakura
- Sennelier
- Sharpie
- Staedtler
- Winsor & Newton
