= Shaoqiang Chen =

Chinese fine artist

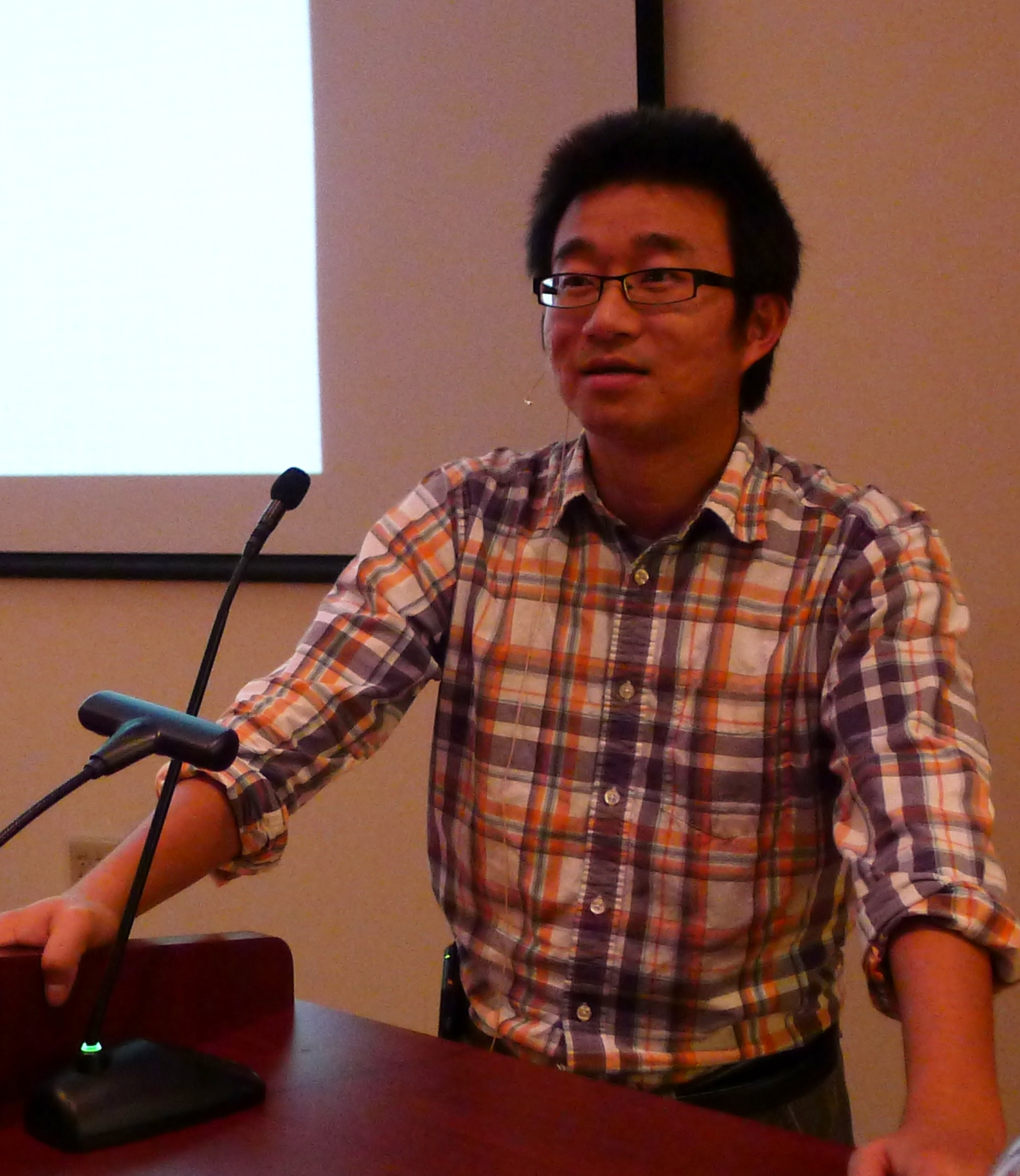
- Shaoqiang Chen's Photo at Chinese Painting Workshop, taken by Lunmei Huang at Virginia Museum of Fine Arts
- Born: 1981 (age 44–45); Nanning, Guangxi, China
- Known for: Painting, Chinese art
- Notable work: Blossom of Hydrangea, Florida Impression, et al

Shaoqiang Chen (Chinese: 陈绍强, born 1981) is a Chinese fine artist known for creation of Heaven Style painting (天堂式画法) and innovation in literati painting. Currently, he is a member of Guangxi Calligraphy & Painting Research Institute, Distinguished International Artist of Yihong Culture Communicate Company, a council member of Richmond Chinese Painting.

== Biography ==
Born in Nanning city, Shaoqiang Chen has shown great interest in painting since childhood. Since his early age, he learned Chinese fine art from masters in China. In particular, Hong Huang was the art teacher who had influenced Shaoqiang Chen's art study most. Shaoqiang Chen learned Chinese painting, calligraphy and seal carving from Hong Huang since very early age, when Hong Huang founded the Yihong Fine Art School(一泓美术学校). And later on, according to Yihong Fine Art School, he became a role model as an alumnus with excellent achievements in art learning and creation. It is also known that he has involved in culture and art exchange program between Austria and China in his young age.

According to an interview by "Calligraphy Reported·Field of Calligraphy and Painting"(书法报·书画天地), Shaoqiang Chen was also significantly influenced by Wu Changshuo's art during his art study. He claimed that Wu Changshuo's calligraphy and painting, especially Wu's seal scripts, fascinated him a lot. Shaoqiang Chen has also published examples of how he conducted creations inspired by Wu Changshuo's art on "Calligraphy Reported·Field of Calligraphy and Painting".

== Art experiences and influence ==
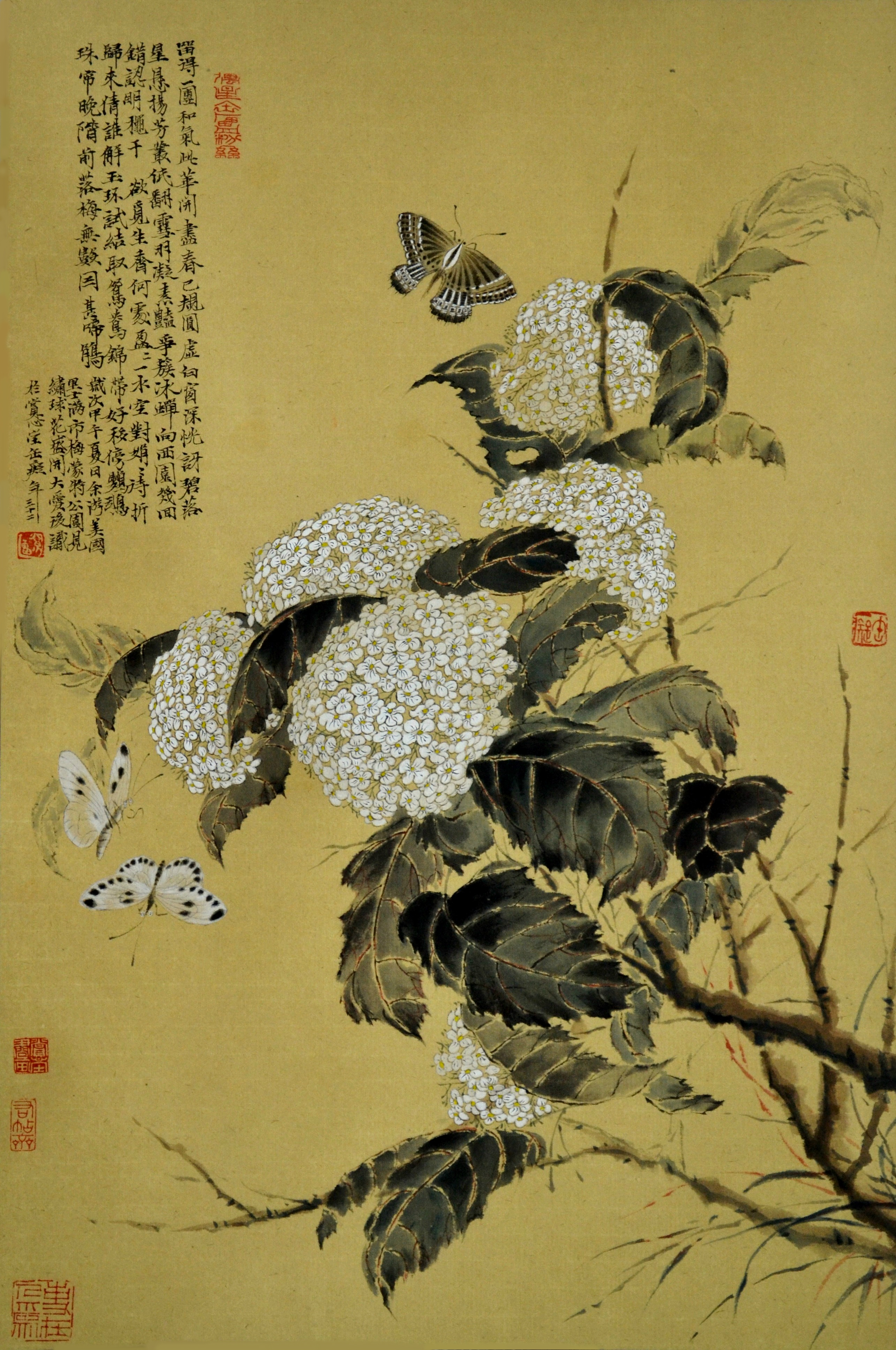
by Shaoqiang Chen, Chinese Ink and Watercolor on Classic Style Rice Paper,75 x 50 cm

Shaoqiang Chen has had systematic calligraphy art development since age of 10. After going to the United States for graduate study in Florida, he continued with Chinese art research and innovation. It is known from several media that he conducted art innovation based on traditional Chinese painting and calligraphy skills, focusing on line and stroke manipulation. Simultaneously he brought in Western painting techniques such as visual contrast and special perspectives of painting, and integrated these Chinese and Western art elements. Also, he developed a macro-to-micro observation approach by boldly mimicking digital camera dynamic zoom functionality to find various perspectives that maximize the detailed beauty of objects in the work. The objects were expressed by the variety and contrast of lines, brushing strokes and ink. Several media, including "Calligraphy Reported·Field of Calligraphy and Painting", "People's Daily Online" and "Chinese Painting & Calligraphy"(中国书画), considered that all of these produced the novel Chinese art style called "Heaven Style", which was an innovation that brought new vigor and vitality to Chinese art field, and shaped a new trend of art. Some of these "Heaven Style" representative works include Florida Impression(佛州印象), Fun in the Lotus Pond Looking from Heaven(从天堂看到的荷塘乐趣), and Blossom of Hydrangea(绣球花开).

According to Calligraphy Reported·Field of Calligraphy and Painting and other international media, post Shaqiang Chen's creation in "Heaven Style" painting, there has been known influence in Chinese painting field. Some artists and students have been following and adhering to this style, naturally forming a school of style called "Heaven School"(天堂画派).

== Career ==
Shaoqiang Chen's art works are featured in the permanent collection of the Guangxi Zhuang Museum, a national primary level museum.

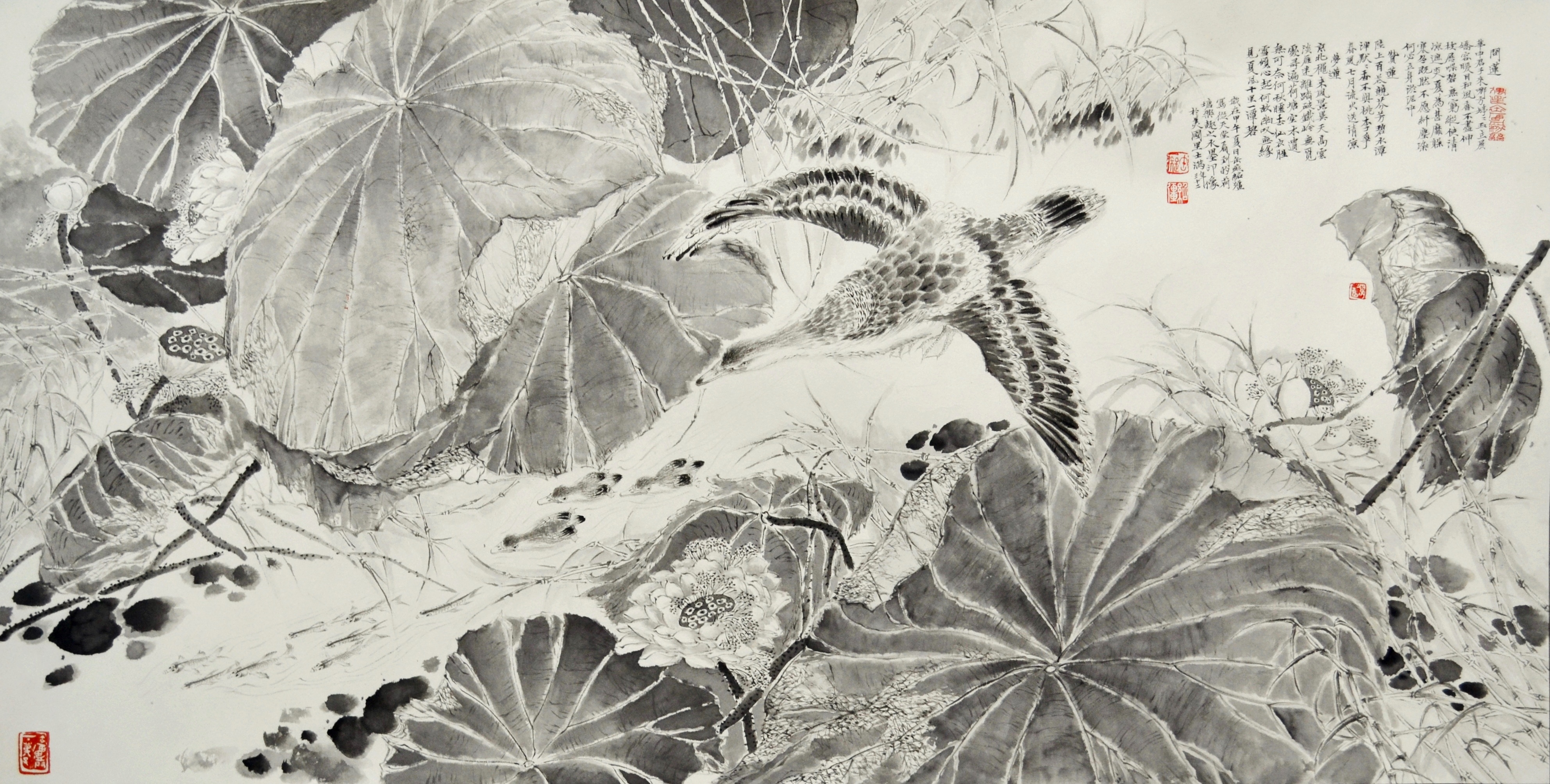
by Shaoqiang Chen, Chinese Ink and Water on Rice Paper, 68 x 136 cm

His arts have also been presented in the review article Fun in the Heaven – Review of Shaoqiang Chen's Arts in Chinese Painting, Calligraphy and Seal Carving (天堂的乐趣：略论陈绍强书画篆刻艺术), published on Chinese Painting & Calligraphy(中国书画), a national level art core journal.

According to Guangxi Fine Arts Publishing House and Guangxi Calligraphy & Painting Research Institute, Shaoqiang Chen's works have also been highly praised by notable experts in the fine art field. Several national and international news media from China have covered his arts as well, such as: "People's Daily Online"(人民网), China News Service(中国新闻社), NetEase, News (网易新闻 163.com), Guangming Online(光明网). He is the author of the art book, Works of Art by Shaoqiang Chen: Chinese Painting, Calligraphy and Seal Carving, published by Guangxi People's Publishing House.

== Awards ==
Awarded "Jerry's Artarama Award", National Art League 85th Jury Open Show, May 2015.

Awarded "Finalist", International Artist Magazine Competition #85 "Floras and Gardens", February/March 2015.

Awarded "Best in the Show", Flower Power Art Competition, focus Point Shape International Online Gallery, April 2015.

Seal Carving Art Winner, Competition in Calligraphy, Painting and Seal Carving, Calligraphy Reported·Field of Calligraphy and Painting, December 2014.

Awarded Membership, Guangxi Calligraphy & Painting Research Institute, July 2014.

Awarded "2nd Place", 4th Botanical Art Competition, Light Space & Time Online Gallery, June 2014.

Awarded "Special Merit Award", 4th Nature Art Competition, Light Space & Time Online Gallery, October 2014.

Awarded "Special Merit Award", 4th Animal Art Competition, Light Space & Time Online Gallery, July 2014.
