= Jerry's Artarama =

American art supplies company

- Type: Private
- Founded: 1968; 58 years ago in Long Island, New York, United States
- Founder: Jerry Goldstein
- Headquarters: Raleigh, North Carolina, United States
- Area served: Worldwide
- Products: Art materials
- Website: www.jerrysartarama.com

Jerry's Artarama is an originator of discount art supplies and materials company currently based in North Carolina, United States. The art materials it provides include fine artist paints, canvas and boards, brushes and palette knives, easels, frames as well as extensive custom canvas and frame departments. They also offer custom picture framing services.

In addition to art materials and supplies, Jerry's Artarama also arranges instructional workshops, art contests, free online video art lessons, new art supply demonstrations, and special art-related events across the country. They also sponsor scholarships for student artists in universities and colleges. In 2015, Jerry's established The Gerald Goldstein Foundation in memory of the company's founder; it grants scholarships to students artists.

== History ==
In 1968, Gerald "Jerry" Goldstein and his wife Arline Goldstein founded Jerry's Artarama in Great Neck, a neighborhood of Long Island, New York. Goldstein had been managing a toy store in Long Island, in which he convinced his boss to stock art supplies, before he started his own business.

Circa 1984, Venture reported that the International Brotherhood of Teamsters Local 810 led a three-week strike against the Queens Jerry's Artarama.

In 1979, New York congressman Benjamin Rosenthal reported purchasing supplies for drafting a bill at Jerry's Artarama as a disbursement on his contingency fund.

By 1986, there was a Jerry's Artarama in New Hyde Park, New York. That year, that location released a 132-page catalog titled A Definitive Reference to Artists' Supplies.

In the 1990s, Goldstein ran a Jerry's Artarama in Deerfield Beach, Florida. There, artists who had been student patrons during the 1960s and 1970s often reunited with Goldstein to let them know the impact he had on their art careers in their youth.

As of 2013, the company offers over 70,000 art materials from various art manufacturers, as well as their own product lines via an online retail store, art supply catalog, and superstores. The corporate headquarters are in Raleigh, North Carolina.

== See also ==
- Utrecht Art Supply
- Blick Art Materials
- Michaels
