= Quai Voltaire =

Thoroughfare in Paris, France

Coordinates: 48.8590°N 2.3308°E

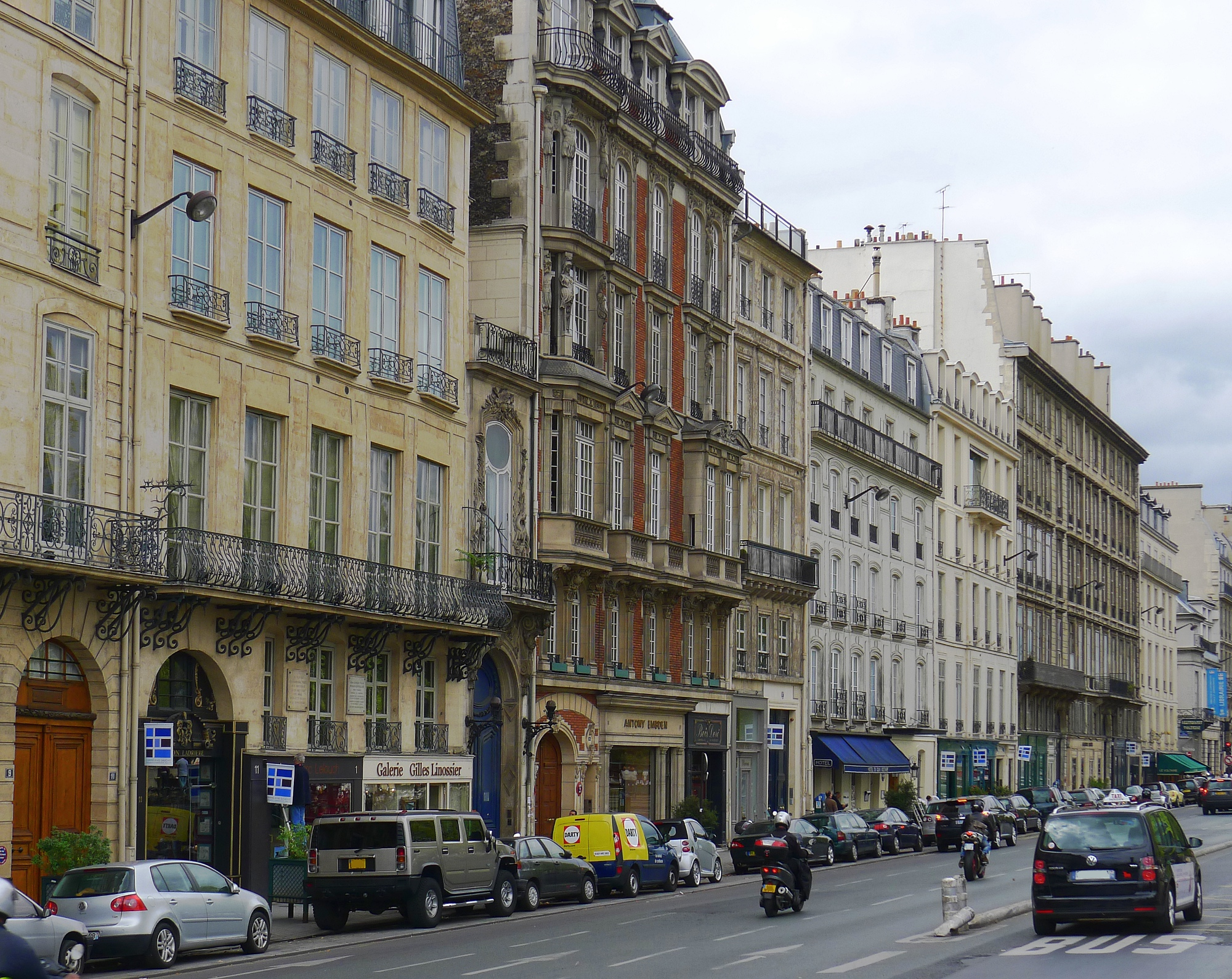
Quai Voltaire in 2011

The Quai Voltaire (French pronunciation: [kɛ vɔltɛʁ]) is a street and quay located in the 7th arrondissement of Paris. 308 meters long, it lies between the Quai Malaquais and the Quai Anatole-France. The Quai Voltaire begins at the Rue des Saints-Pères and ends at the Rue de Bac and the Pont Royal.

== History ==
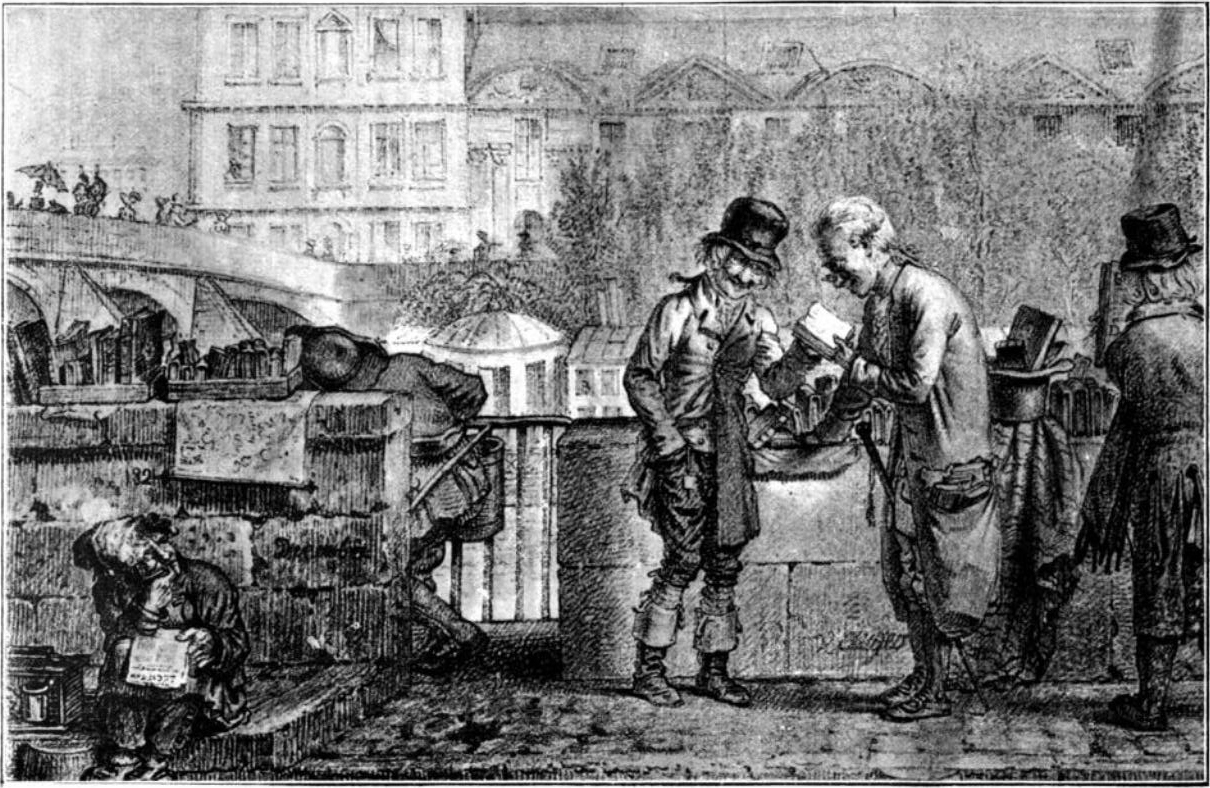
A bookseller on the Quai Voltaire, 1821

Originally the Quai Voltaire was the western portion of the Quai Malaquais. In 1644, it was renamed the Quai des Théatins after some Theatines built a monastery on the quay (today located at no. 23 and no. 25 Quai Voltaire). In 1791, the wharf became known as the Quai Voltaire in homage to the writer who died in 1778 in the home of Charles, marquis de Villette. After Honoré de Balzac set his novel La Peau de chagrin in the Quai Voltaire, antique shops became common in the quay. In the early 19th century, the area became a well-known place for booksellers to peddle their wares.

== Notable buildings ==
- No. 1: The Hôtel de Bouillon and the Hôtel de Tessé were built in 1768 by Pierre-Noël Rousset and Louis Le Tellier for Charlotte de Béthune-Charost and her son the Count of Tessé. In 1742, Jean-François Boyvin de Bonnetot equipped himself with wings and attempted to fly off the roof of the hotel. He briefly hovered 300 meters above the Seine before falling into a boat and breaking his leg. The hotel was also the site of Thomas Robert Bugeaud's death in 1849. After President Jacques Chirac left office in 2007, he moved his family into the Hôtel de Bouillon.
- No. 3 and no. 5: Hôtel Le Barbier, Hôtel Perrault, and Hôtel de La Briffe were all one unit until 1733. They were connected by a tunnel with the other side of the Rue de Bourbon. Author Maurice Joly lived there in a small apartment until his death in 1878. The Sennelier shop was opened on the site in 1887. It became famous for supplying art supplies to artists such as Cézanne, Degas, Gauguin, Pissarro, Soutine, Modigliani, Kandinsky, Bonnard, and Picasso.
