= Mwass Githinji =

Kenyan visual artist (born 1995)

Mwass Githinji (born Benard Mwangi Githinji,1995) is a Kenyan contemporary visual artist whose work explores identity, memory, vulnerability and the human condition through expressive figurative works. Working primarily in oil paint and oil pastel on black canvas, he has developed a distinctive visual language characterised by symbolic imagery, layered surfaces and dramatic use of chiaroscuro. Drawing on recurring motifs from animals, flora, mythology and the human figure, his paintings examine the relationship between individual experience and broader social and cultural questions. Using oil pastels and black pigment on canvas, Githinji produces striking figurative images that invite viewers to confront and celebrate the events and narratives that continuously shape contemporary Black life.

== Background ==
Githinji was raised with his parents and two brothers. His mother worked as a teacher and his father was a farmer. As a child he often competed in drawing contests with his brothers and spent time drawing in his mother's classrooms using chalk from the school. According to accounts of his early life, his preference for black backgrounds developed during these formative years.

In 2015, Githinji moved to Nairobi to study at the Buruburu Institute of Fine Arts. After graduating, he worked as an illustrator in the publishing industry while continuing to develop his artistic practice independently.

== Career ==
Githinji draws on rural upbringing, African storytelling, mythology, and personal memory in his work. His paintings examine vulnerability, childhood life, social pressure, and emotional struggle, often through distorted figurative forms and dark backgrounds. He has described his practice as a conversation between canvas, creator and witness.

== Selected exhibitions ==
- 2026 - Faces and Masks: The Interwooven Relation by Wikimedia CH- Group Exhibition, Nairobi
- 2026 - Memory in Motion: Identities, Materials and Resonances, San Francisco, USA
- 2026 - Afropop - Group Exhibition - The Melrose Gallery, Minnesota, USA
- 2025 - Untitled - Group Exhibition - Kamene Cultural Center, Nairobi

== Solo shows ==
- 2025 – Beasts and Petals, Redhill Gallery, Nairobi Kenya
- 2023 – Who we Are, National Museums of Kenya, Nairobi
