= Gustavo Ramos =

Gustavo Ramos may refer to:

- Gustavo Ramos Hernández (born 1974), Mexican equestrian
- Gustavo Ramos (artist) (born 1993), Brazilian-American fine artist and oil painter
- Gustavo Ramos (footballer) (born 1996), Brazilian footballer
