= Bouquinistes =

Booksellers on the banks of the Seine, Paris

Coordinates: 48.85296°N 2.34728°E

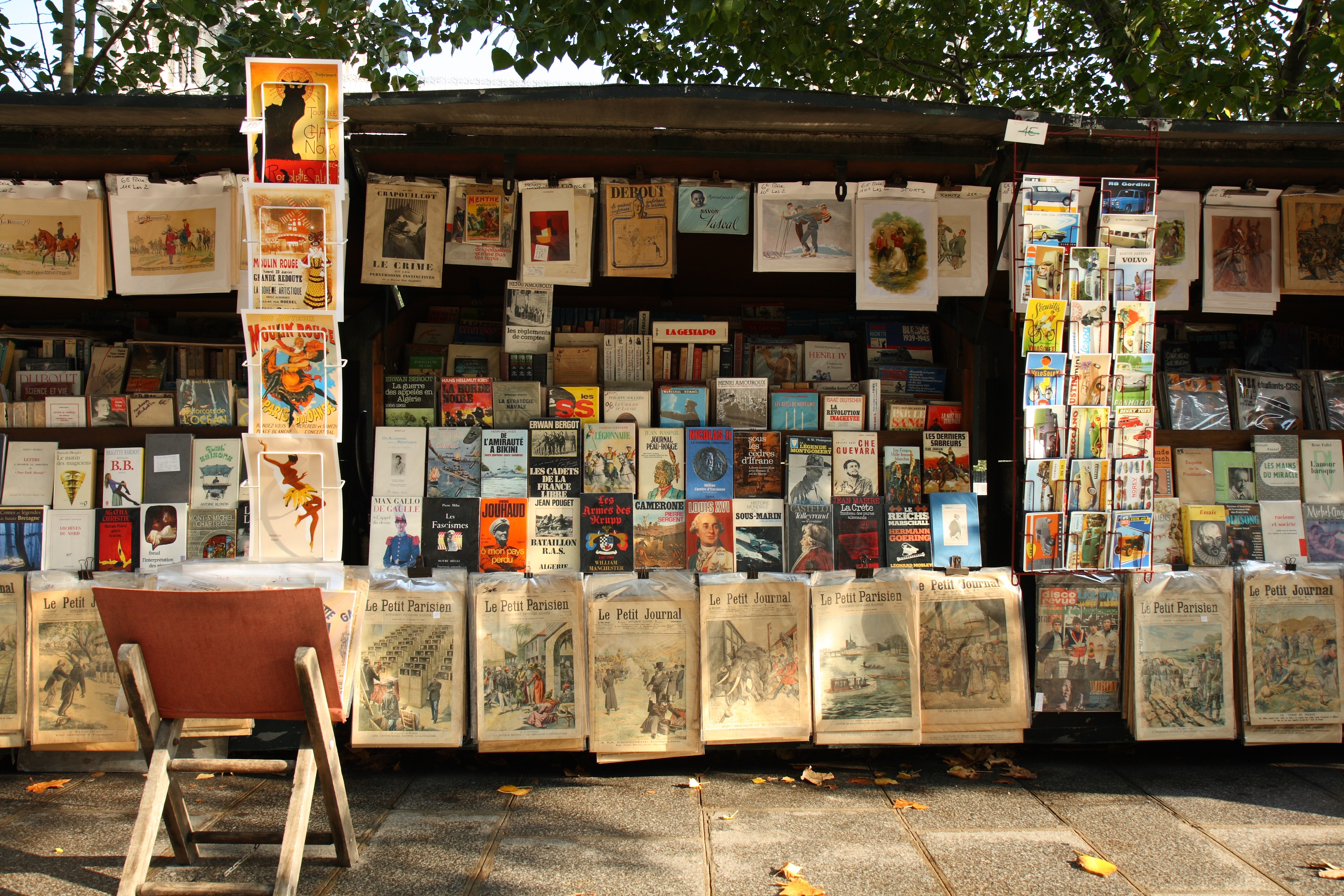
Bouquinistes stall in 2007

The Bouquinistes of Paris, France, are booksellers of used and antiquarian books and rare vintage postcards who ply their trade along large sections of the banks of the Seine: on the right bank from the Pont Marie to the Quai du Louvre, and on the left bank from the Quai de la Tournelle to Quai Voltaire. The Seine is thus described as 'the only river in the world that runs between two bookshelves'.

== Etymology ==
The term "bouquiniste" appears in the dictionary of the Académie française in 1762. The term "boucquain", which derived from the Dutch boekijn ("little book"), appeared in 1459 and is recorded as "bouquin" towards the end of the 16th century. The first mention of the word "bouquin" appears in 1580, while the term Bouquinistes refers to a second-hand book dealer.

== History ==
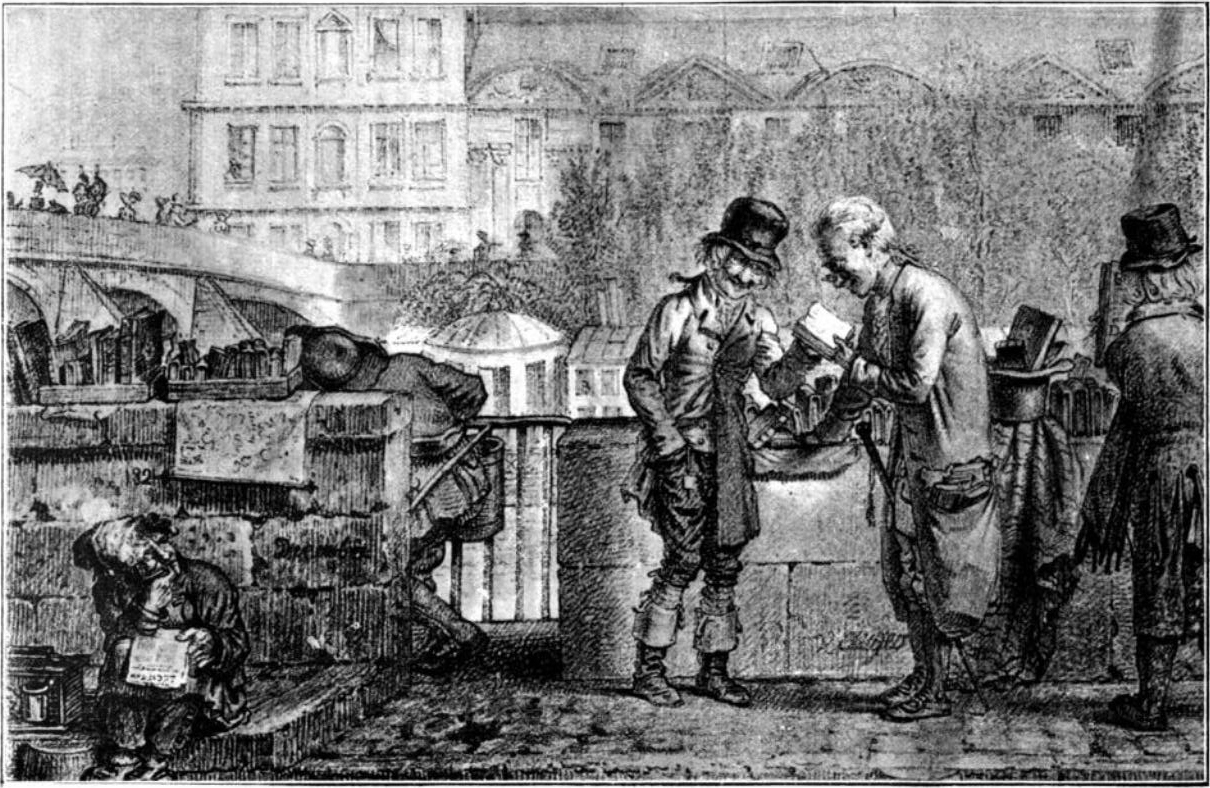
Engraving by Jean Henry Marlet after Adrien Victor Auger, Bouquiniste quai Voltaire 1821

Itinerant booksellers had sold books along the Pont Neuf by the early 17th century, but by 1756 the Council of State forbade the selling of books on the Pont Neuf to allow traffic flow which pushed the booksellers to set up their wares along the Seine.

In 1859, concessions were implemented by the city of Paris and the bouquinistes were permitted to be established at fixed points. Each one is entitled to 10 meters of railing for an annual fee of 26, 35 F and a 25 F licence. By 1866, Paul Lacroix fought for the rights of the booksellers to sell along the quays, inviting Napoleon III to visit the quays. In 1891, their requests to leave the boxes at night was approved. In 1930 the dimensions of the "boxes" were fixed.

During the 1970s, the bouquinistes felt threatened by the construction of the Voie Express Rive Gauche on the bank of the Seine. By then, Parisians' interest for literature decreased (as TV and radio increased in demand), leading to a decline in the quality of the antiques distributed by the bouquinistes. French President François Mitterrand was a regular customer of Paris' bouquinistes.

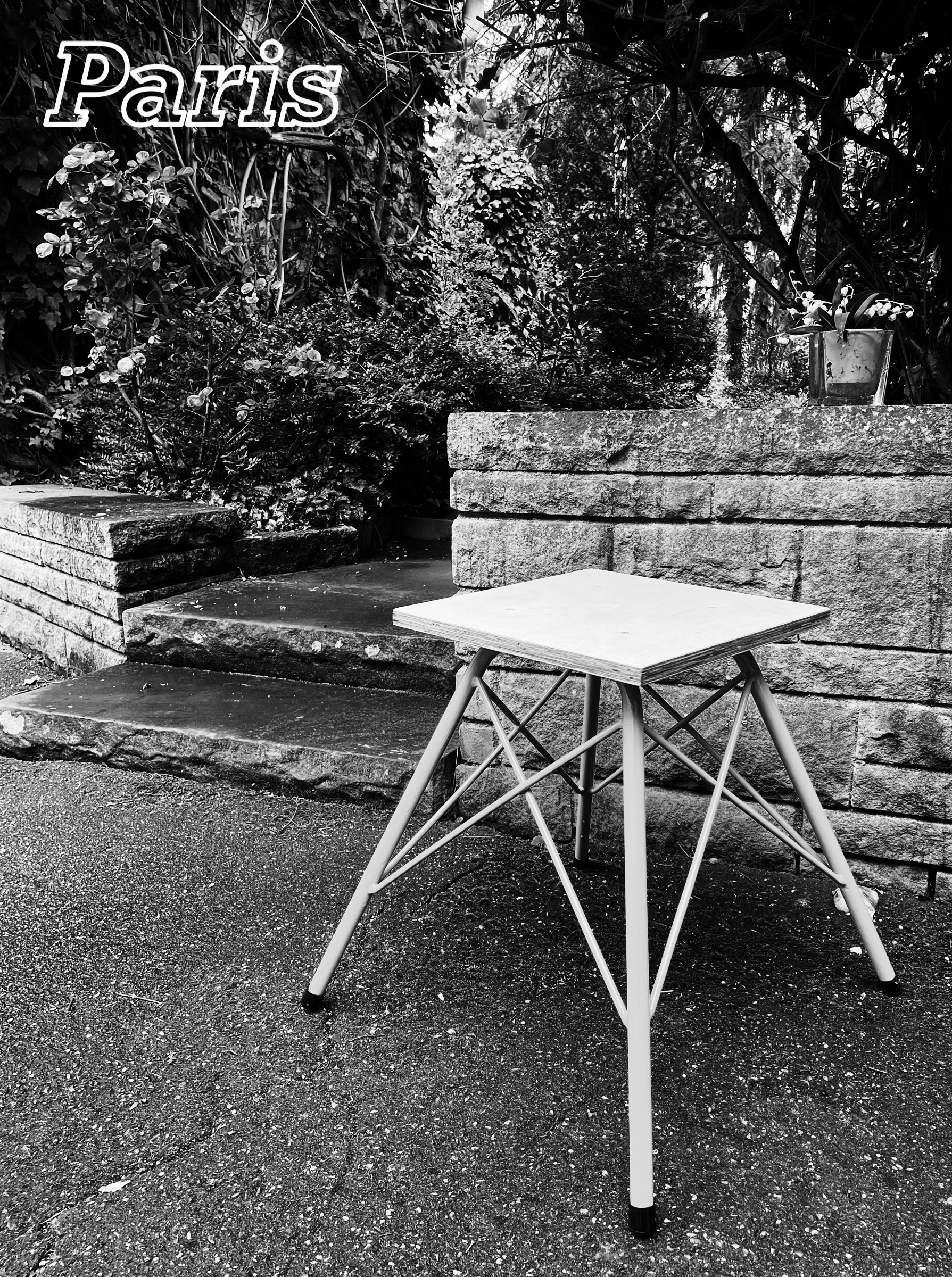
Vintage postcard of Paris. Motive: "Eiffel Tower stool" on the bouquinistes banks of the Seine in Paris, 1973

Installed along more than three kilometers of the Seine and declared a UNESCO World Heritage site, the 240 bouquinistes make use of 900 "green boxes" to house some 300,000 old books and a very great number of journals, stamps and trading cards.

The second-hand booksellers of Paris have inspired booksellers in other cities such as Ottawa, Beijing and Tokyo.

== 2024 Olympics proposal ==
Part of the plan to ensure security for public viewing space around the Seine during the 2024 Summer Olympics opening ceremony was to remove the bouquinistes from the banks of Seine. The booksellers strongly campaigned against their boxes being moved, even if they had to be closed, with President Emmanuel Macron eventually ruling that they should not be moved and requesting a different security plan. Macron said that the bouquinistes are part of the city's "living heritage".

== Excerpt from the "Rules of Bouquinistes" ==
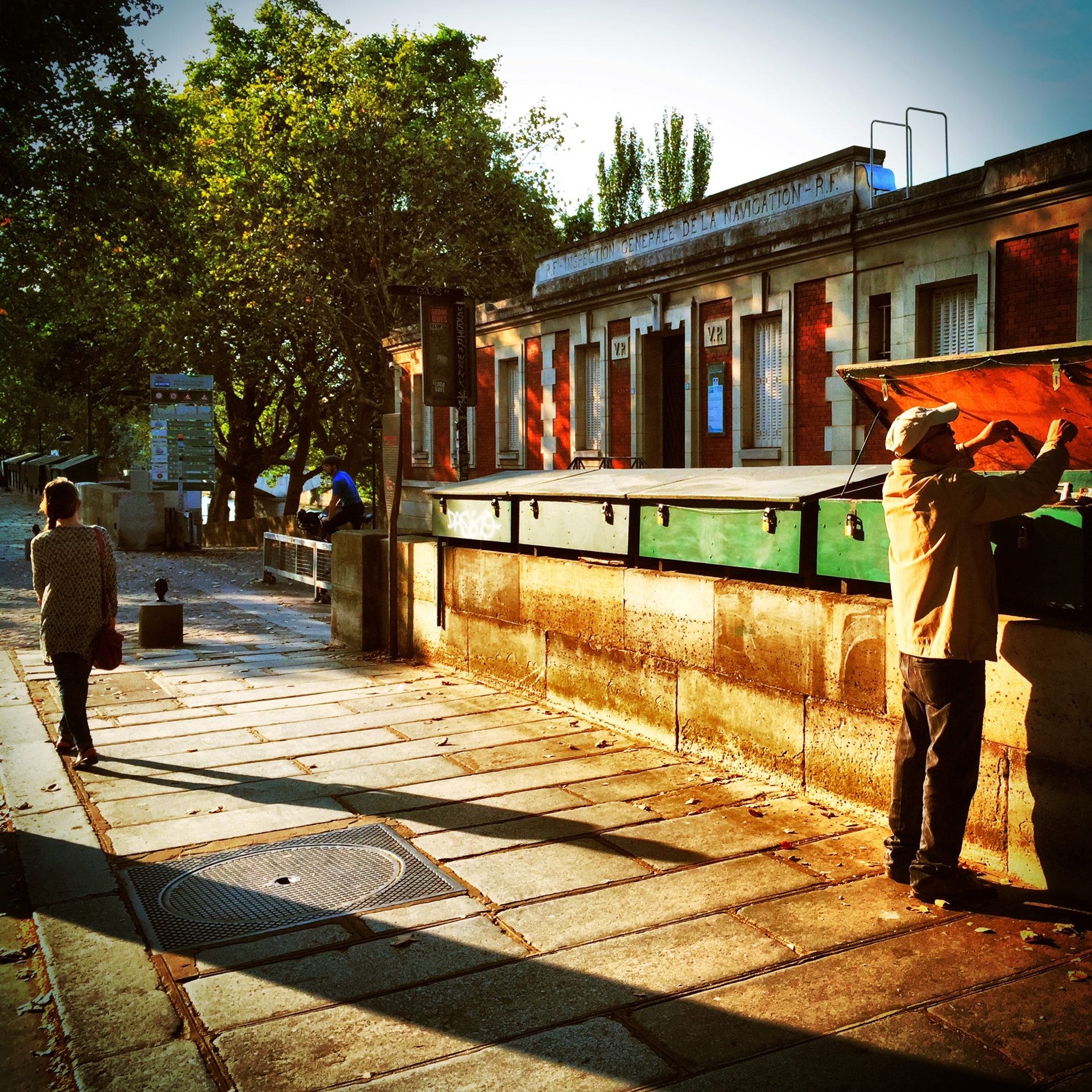
A bookseller closes his stall for the day

Article 9 of the by-law of October 1993, signed by Jacques Chirac:

The boxes used by book stores will be of a type approved by the Administration with an external bodywork determined by the dimensions below, for a maximum length of 8.6 metres:

- Length: 2 metres
- Width: 0.75 metres
- Height:
  - Seine side: 0.6 metres
  - Shore side: 0.35 metres
- (These dimensions are for closed boxes, lids included).
- During use, the upper edge of the opened box should not reach over 2.1 metres above the ground.

== In popular culture ==
- The Bookseller (2012), a mystery novel by Mark Pryor (Seventh Street Books, Amherst, NY), features a bouquiniste character named Max Koche.

== See also ==
- Books in France
