= Heaven Style painting =

Heaven Style painting (天堂式画法) is a new style of Chinese painting created in the 21st century by a Chinese artist named Shaoqiang Chen. According to points of view by artists, art institutes, publications and media, the Heaven Style painting was derived based on painting techniques from the Song dynasty (960–1279) and Yuan dynasty (1271–1368). Also, some techniques of perspective science and contemporary photography were also introduced to search optimal surface of expressing objects in the painting.

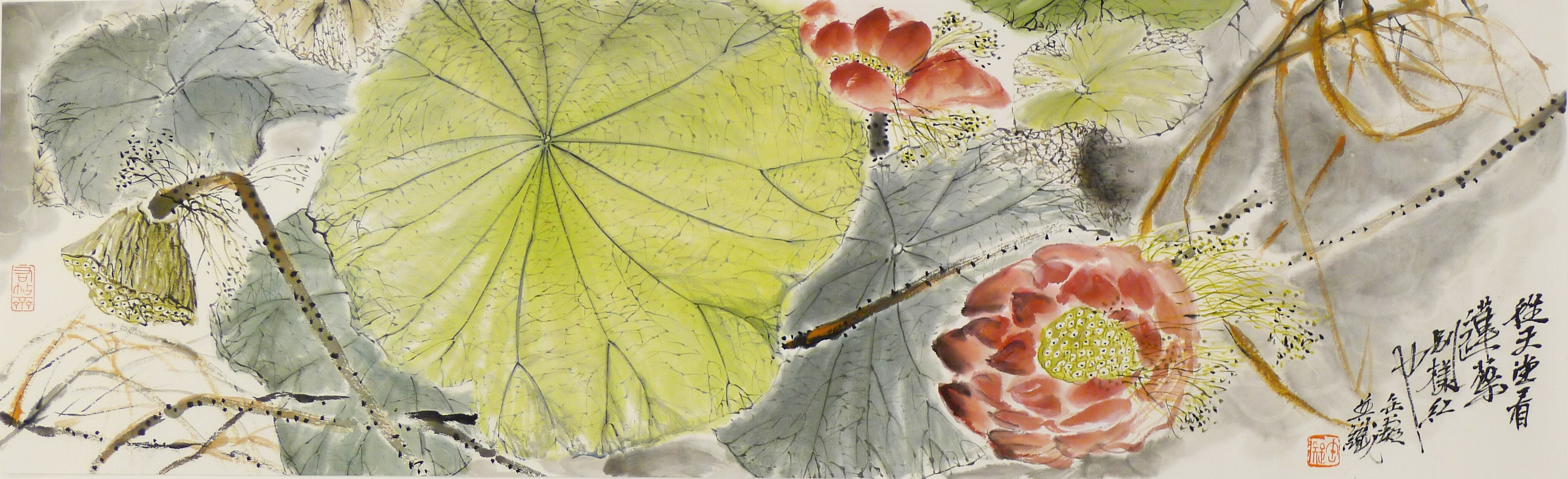
Elegance of the Lotus Looking from Heaven, by Shaoqiang Chen, Chinese Ink and Watercolor on Rice Paper

Lotus painting with overlook perspective is a typical example. Zhi Chen (陈志), a Heaven Style artist, commented that instead of painting those floras using regular perspective such as side view in traditional Chinese painting, Heaven Style painting adopted overlook view, which would give people a feeling of looking down from the sky.

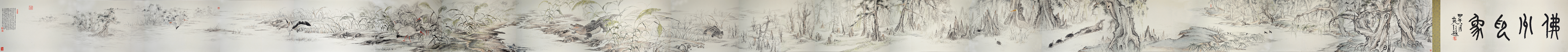
Panorama Long Scroll Painting Florida Impression, by Shaoqiang Chen, Chinese Ink and Watercolor on Rice Paper, 58 x 1800 cm

Besides manipulating perspectives, it is also known that Heaven Style painting uses different granularities of strokes and lines to depict different levels of object details. It mimics digital camera's zoom-in and zoom-out functionality in taking video. This approach was applied in panorama long scroll painting to express both the micro and macro aspects. A representative work is panorama scroll "Florida Impression"(佛州印象), created by Shaoqiang Chen. Another feature of Heaven Style painting is that it tries to integrate Western painting technique in using color, such as contrast and color thickness. Some examples are "Blossom of Hydrangea" (绣球花开) created by Shaoqiang Chen, "Delight with the Red" (老来红) created by Zhi Chen, etc.

== Heaven Style Painting School ==
Artists, art institutes and media have acknowledged that a new school called Heaven Style Painting School (or Heaven School, Chinese: 天堂画派) has been formed due to other artists’ adherence to Heaven Style painting after its creation. Artists of this style include: Ming Li (李铭), Zhi Chen (陈志), Yue Xu (许悦), and so on.

== Representative works ==
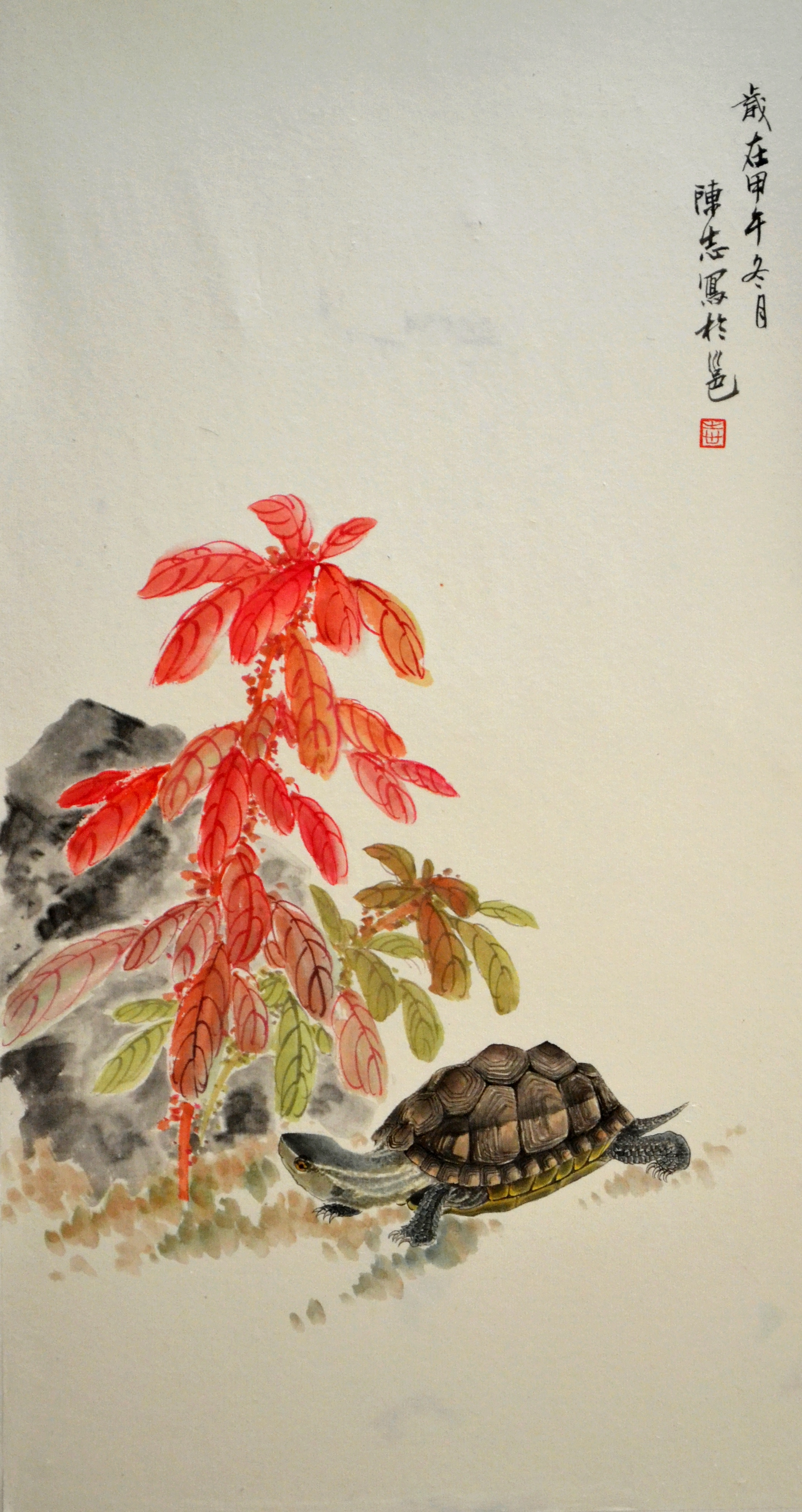
Delight with the Red, by Zhi Chen, Chinese Ink and Watercolor on Rice Paper, 60x27cm

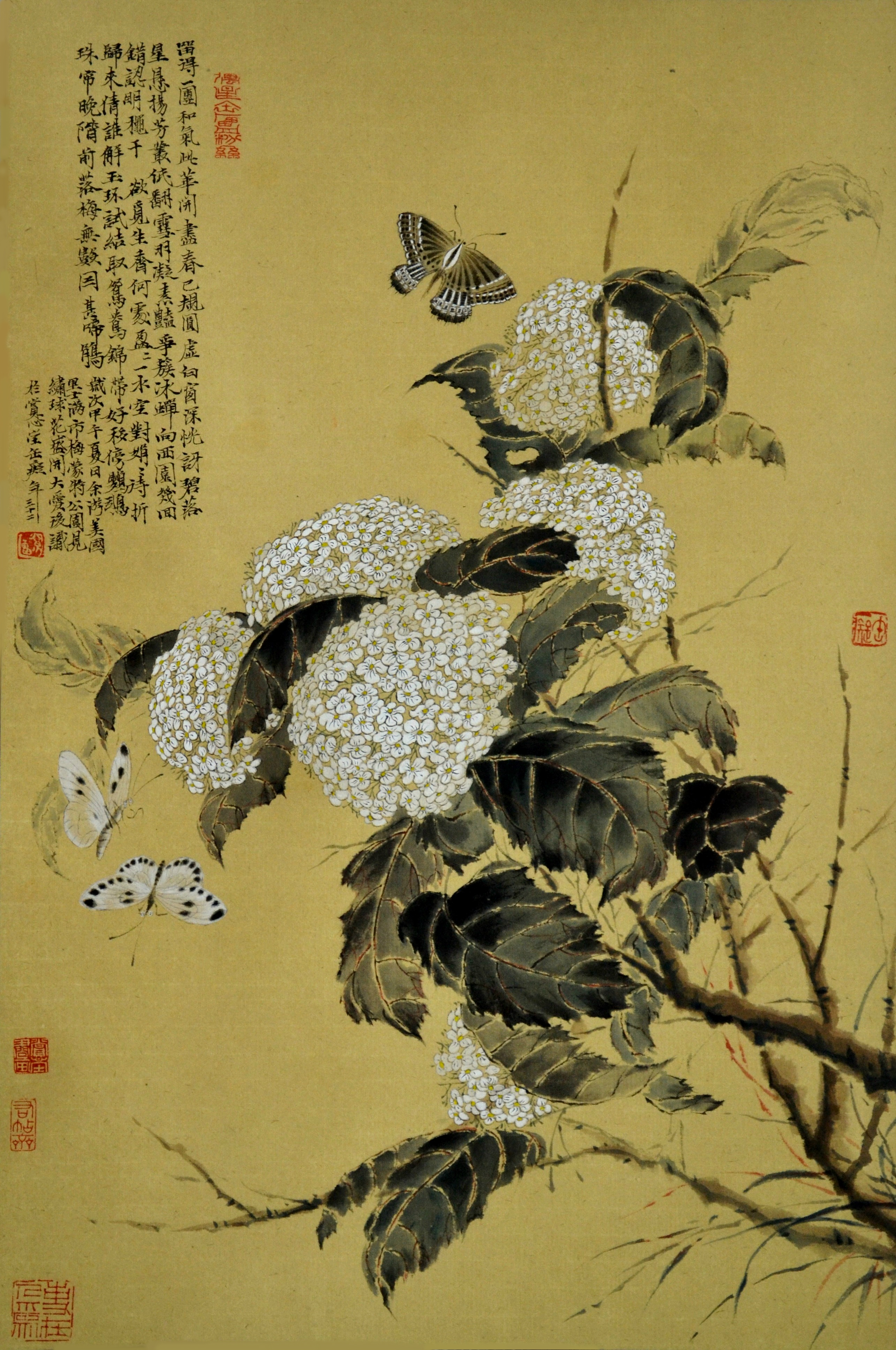
Blossom of Hydrangea, by Shaoqiang Chen, Chinese Ink and Watercolor on Rice Paper, 60x27cm

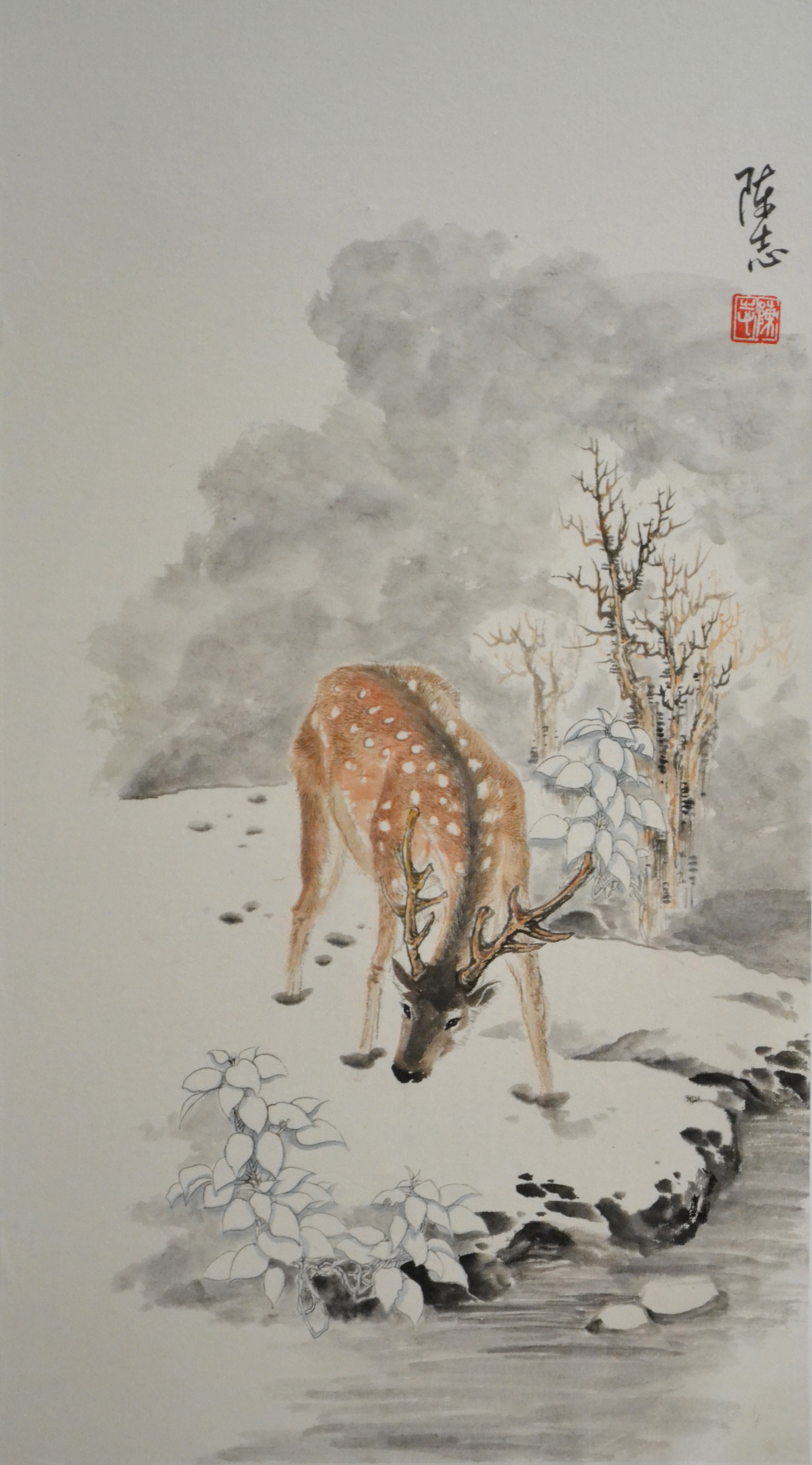
Delight in the Winter, by Zhi Chen, Chinese Ink and Watercolor on Rice Paper

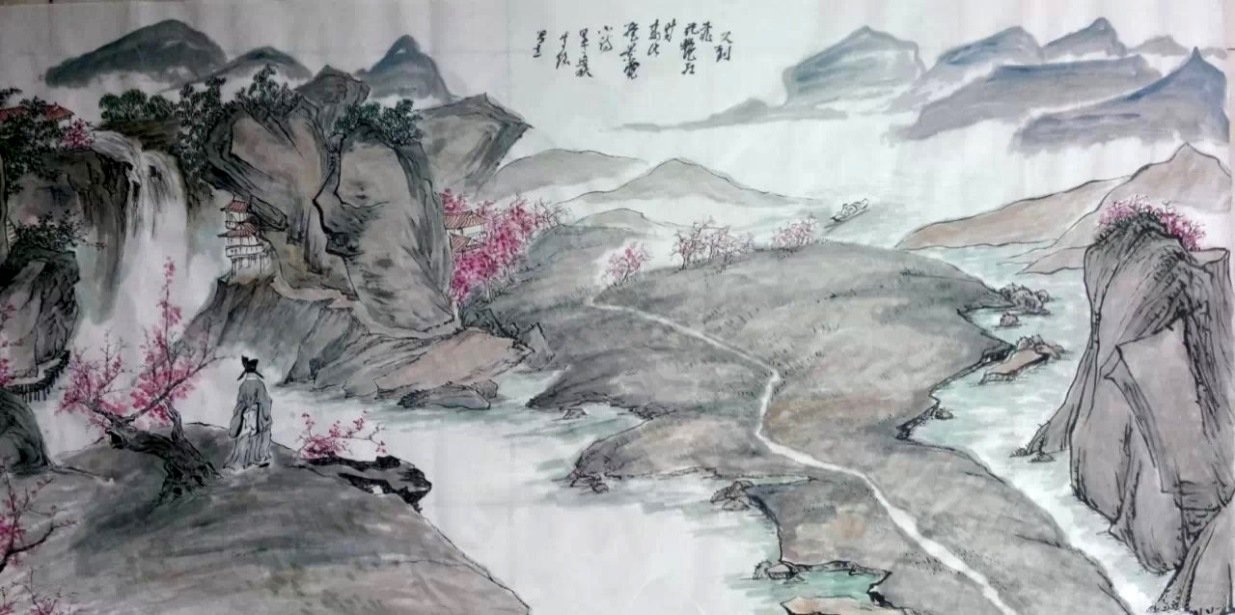
When Peach Blossom Again, by Ming Li, Chinese Ink and Watercolor on Rice Paper

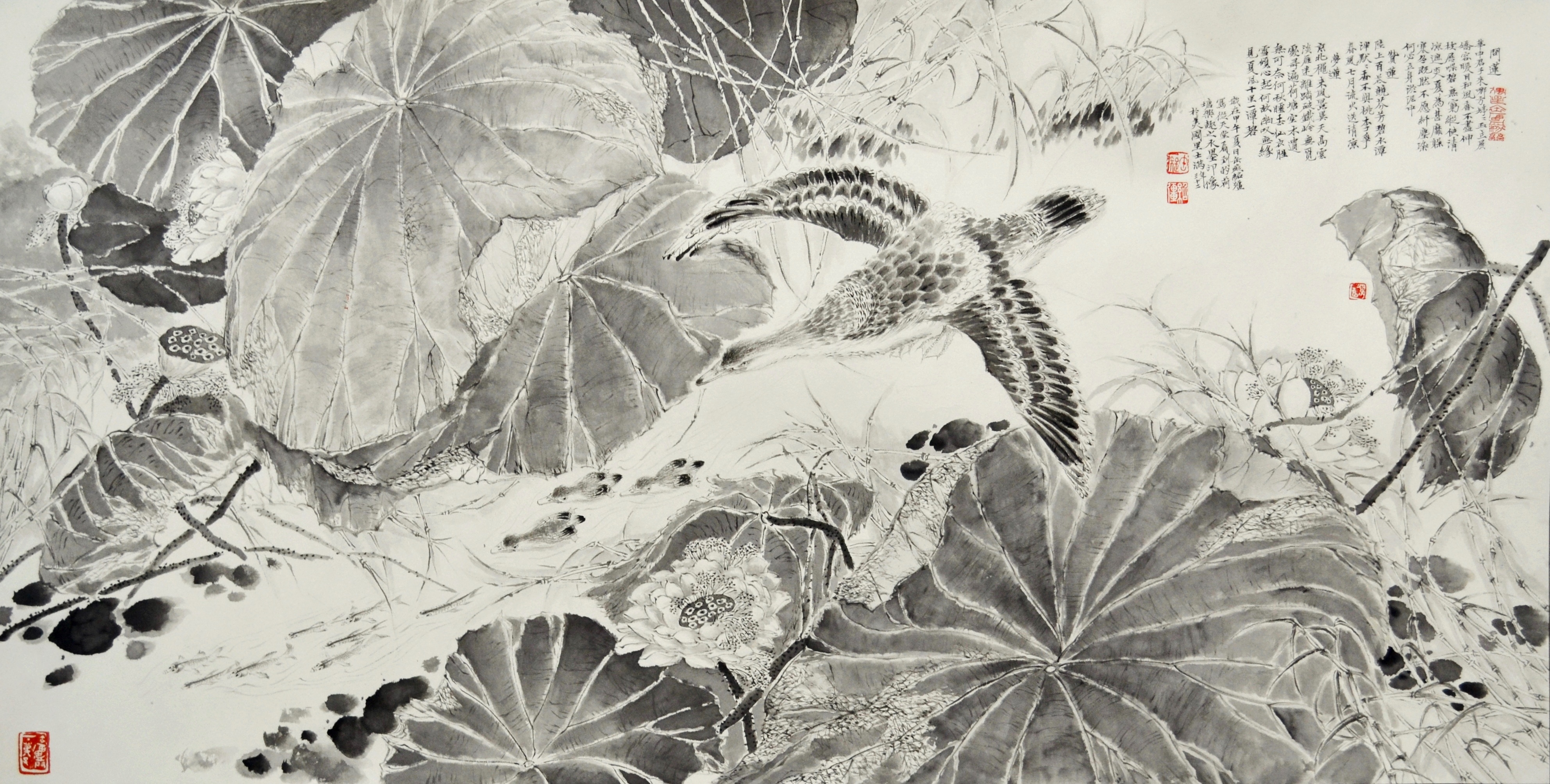
by Shaoqiang Chen, Chinese Ink and Water on Rice Paper
