= Gustavo Ramos (artist) =

Brazilian-American Artist

- Born: 18 November 1993 (age 32); Maringá, Paraná, Brazil
- Education: Southern Virginia University
- Style: Contemporary Realism
- Website: https://www.gustavoramos.art/

Gustavo Ramos speaking at the J. Max Bond Jr. portrait unveiling, Harvard Club of New York City (2026)

Gustavo Ramos (born 1993) is a Brazilian-American fine artist and oil painter. He initially gained recognition for painting a series of realistic portraits that went on to receive national and international awards. In 2020, he was a featured artist at the Springville Museum of Art, where one of his paintings was acquired for the museum's permanent collection. In 2022, he was selected as a winner of Royal Talens' The Year of Rembrandt Award, when his work was displayed in the Rijksmuseum. Ramos' notable portrait commissions include Puerto Rican independence leader Pedro Albizu Campos and architect J. Max Bond Jr. for the Harvard Club of New York City, as well as Irish novelist James Joyce for The Atlantic.

== Early life and education ==
Gustavo Ramos was born in 1993 in the country of Brazil. At the age of 15, he moved to Phoenix, Arizona. Not being fluent in the English language, he turned his attention to facial expressions and bodily gestures which precipitated his interest in portrait drawing and painting. He went on to study oil painting at Southern Virginia University where he earned his bachelor's degree in 2017. In that same year, he was the recipient of the John F. and Anna Lee Stacey Foundation Fine Art Award. He later attended the Florence Academy of Art.

== Career ==
While Ramos was still in college, he created several self-portrait drawings as he studied the techniques of the old masters. In 2020, one of his self-portraits from this period was featured on the cover of The Artist's Magazine's "The Best of Drawing," earning him nationwide recognition.

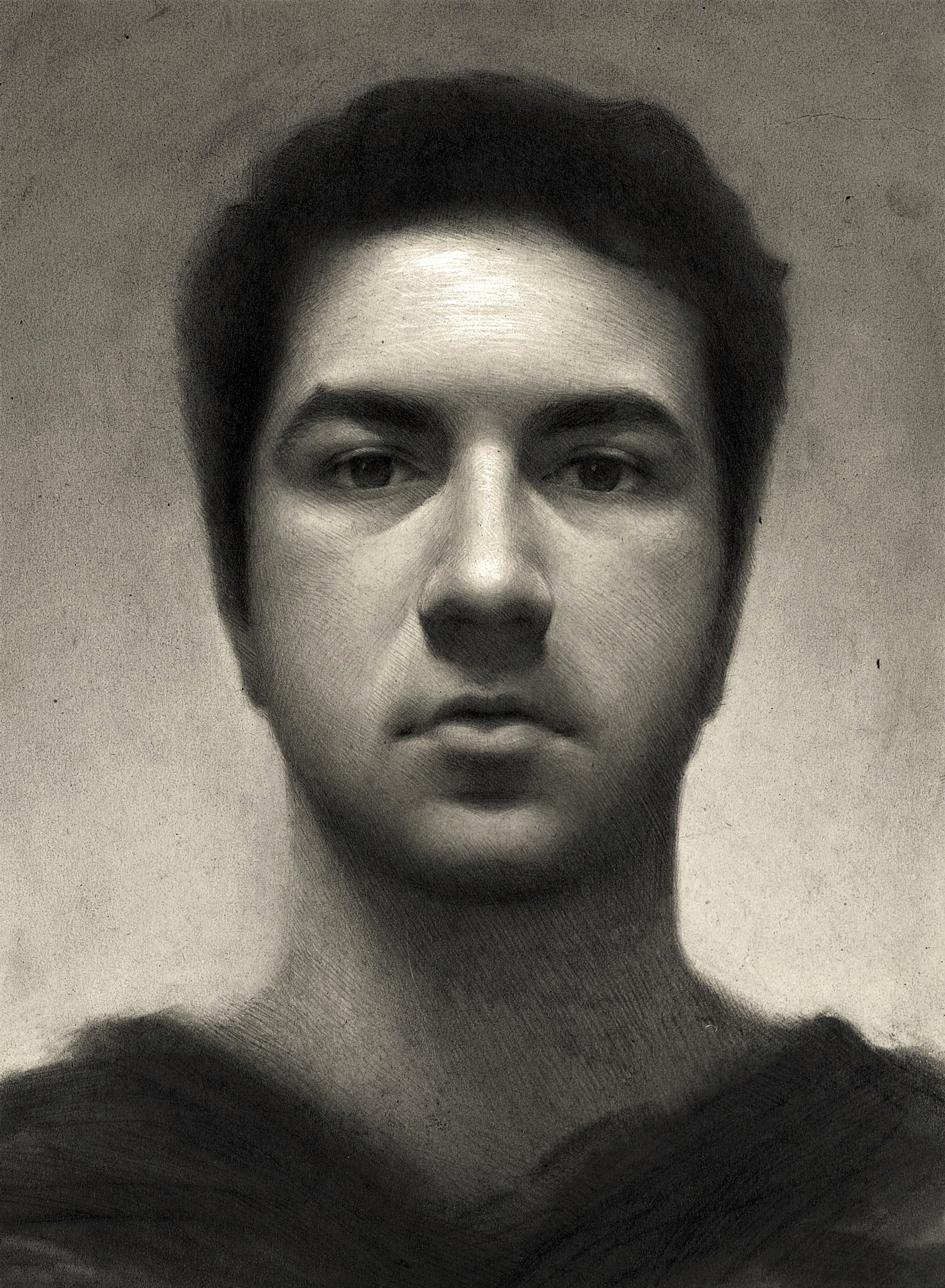
"Self-Portrait in Black" by Gustavo Ramos, 2017.

After finishing his studies in 2018, Ramos created a series of realistic portrait paintings with a focus on psychological narratives that would go on to be featured in publications like The Artist's Magazine, Fine Art Connoisseur, BuzzFeed and Southwest Art which included him in "21 Under 31: Young Artists to Buy Now". In 2019, Ramos was accepted into the Art Renewal Center 13th Annual Salon, with his selected painting receiving a Staff Award and travelling to Sotheby's and the European Museum of Modern Art. In 2021, Ramos earned his place as a finalist in the Boynes Emerging Artist Award.

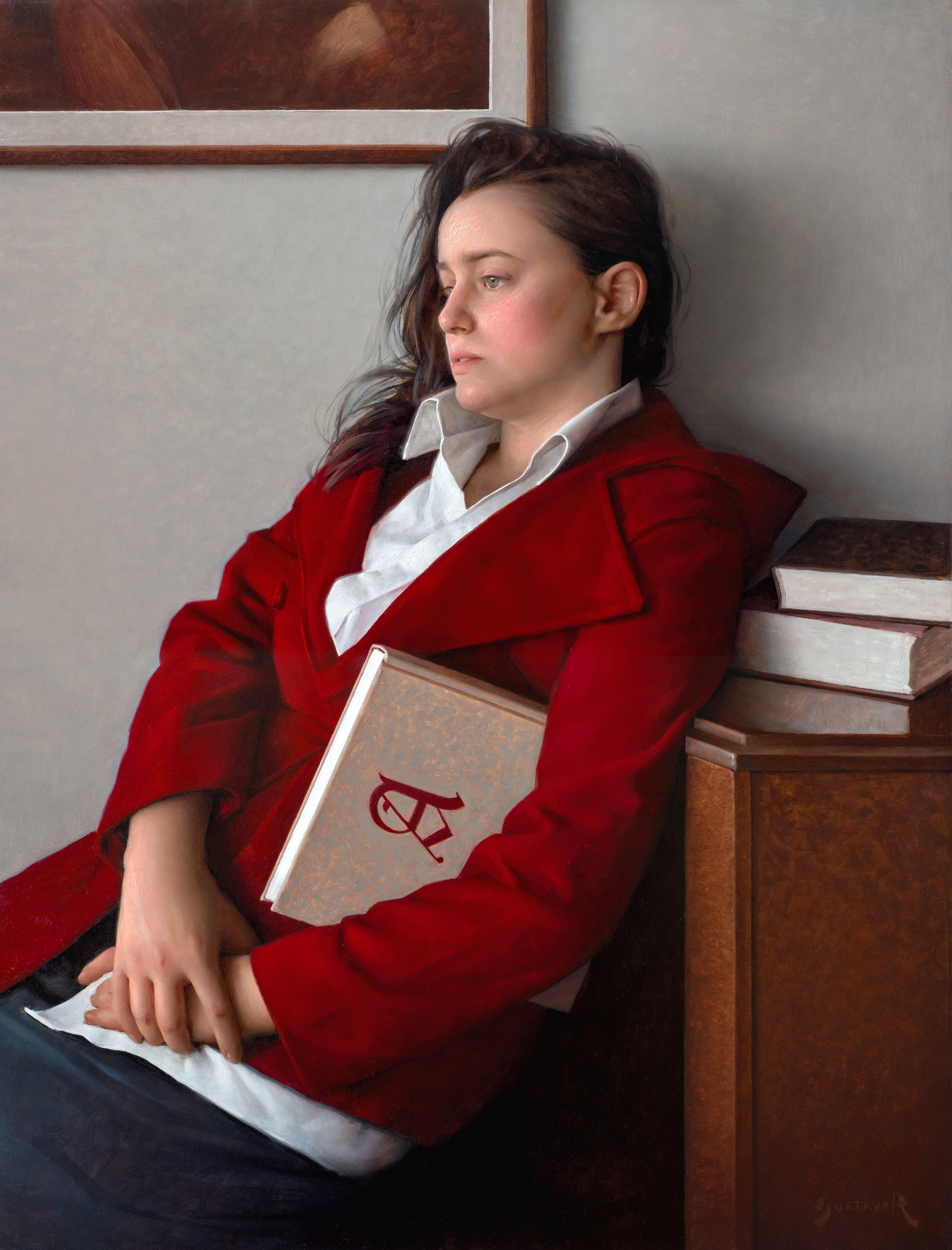
"Woman in Red" Oil on panel, 2020, Gustavo Ramos

In 2022, Ramos was selected by Royal Talens as the artist to represent North America in The Year of Rembrandt, where he was awarded a trip to the Netherlands and the opportunity to display his work at the Rijksmuseum alongside the 6 other winning artists.

In 2024, Ramos was included into the Lunar Codex, a time capsule launched to the Moon named the most expansive, international, and diverse collection of contemporary culture launched into space. His selected painting "Winter" was published in Veja Magazine, Brazil's most influential outlet of printed media, as part of an article covering the Lunar Codex.

Gustavo Ramos presenting his painting of Pedro Albizu Campos at the Harvard CLub of New York City in 2025

In 2025, Ramos was commissioned to paint a formal portrait of Puerto Rican attorney and independence activist Pedro Albizu Campos, which was unveiled at the Harvard Club of New York City for permanent display. Also in 2025, the portrait of Irish novelist James Joyce by Ramos was featured in The Atlantic magazine’s July issue accompanying a review of Joyce and his biographer Richard Ellmann. In 2026, he returned to the Harvard Club of New York City to unveil a commissioned portrait of architect J. Max Bond Jr.

Ramos has most recently stepped into educational roles, including teaching workshops at the Scottsdale Artists School, Art Fest Mesa, being a guest lecturer for Artists Magazine, and releasing an online drawing course with Domestika.

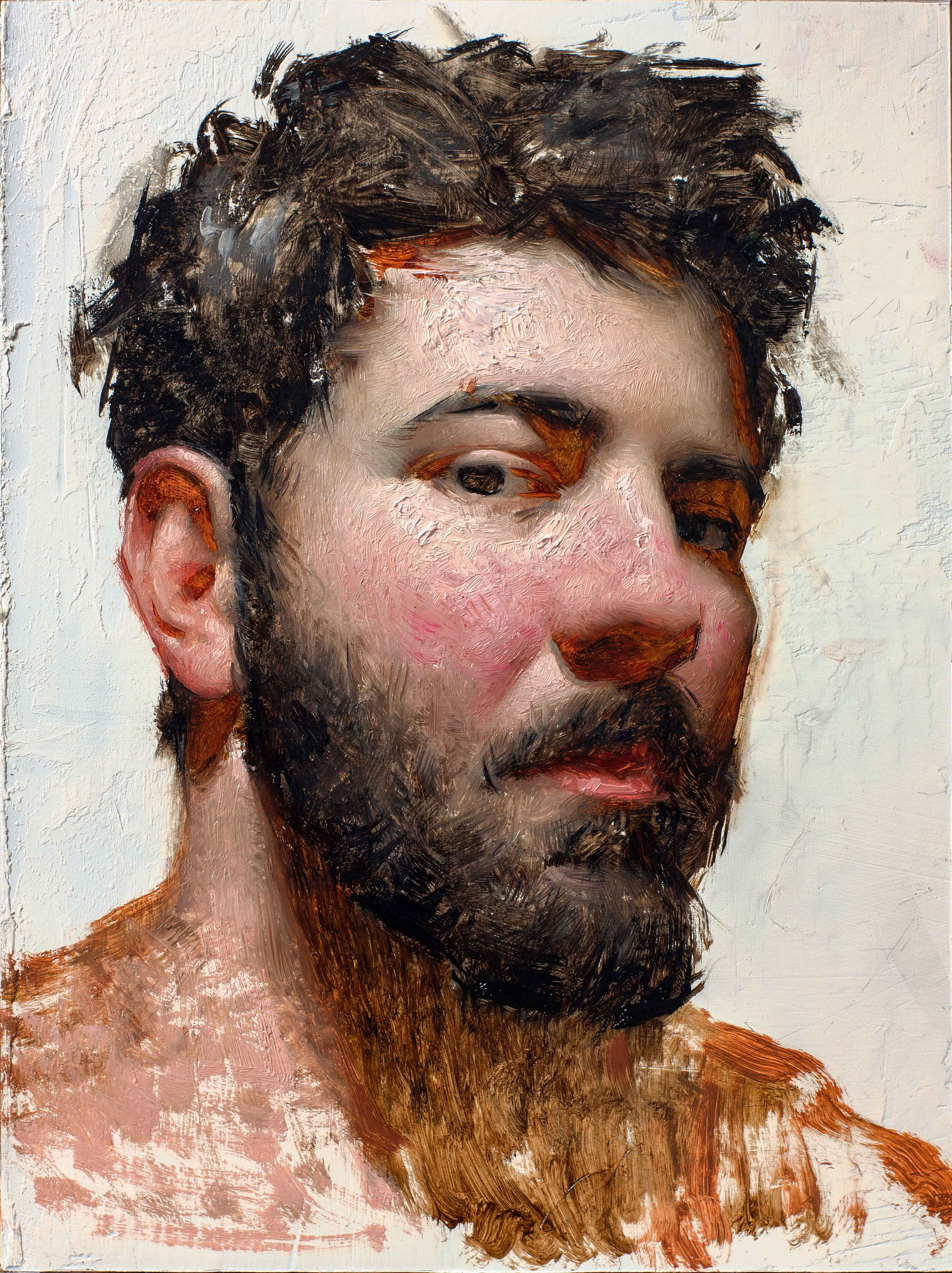
"Self-Portrait at 28" Oil on panel, Gustavo Ramos
