= Blick Art Materials =

American art supply company

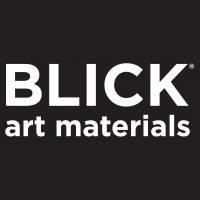
- 2017 logo
- Type: Private
- Predecessor: Dick Blick Art Materials (1911-1974)
- Founded: 1911; 115 years ago Galesburg, Illinois, U.S.
- Founders: Dick Blick; Grace Blick
- Number of locations: 62 (2023)
- Key people: Robert Buchsbaum, CEO
- Products: Art supplies and equipment
- Owner: Dick Blick Holdings, Inc.
- Subsidiaries: Utrecht Art Supplies
- Website: www.dickblick.com

Blick Art Materials is a family-owned retailer and catalog art supply business based in the United States. It was established as a mail order business by Dick Blick in 1911 and purchased by Robert Metzenberg in 1947.

== Background ==
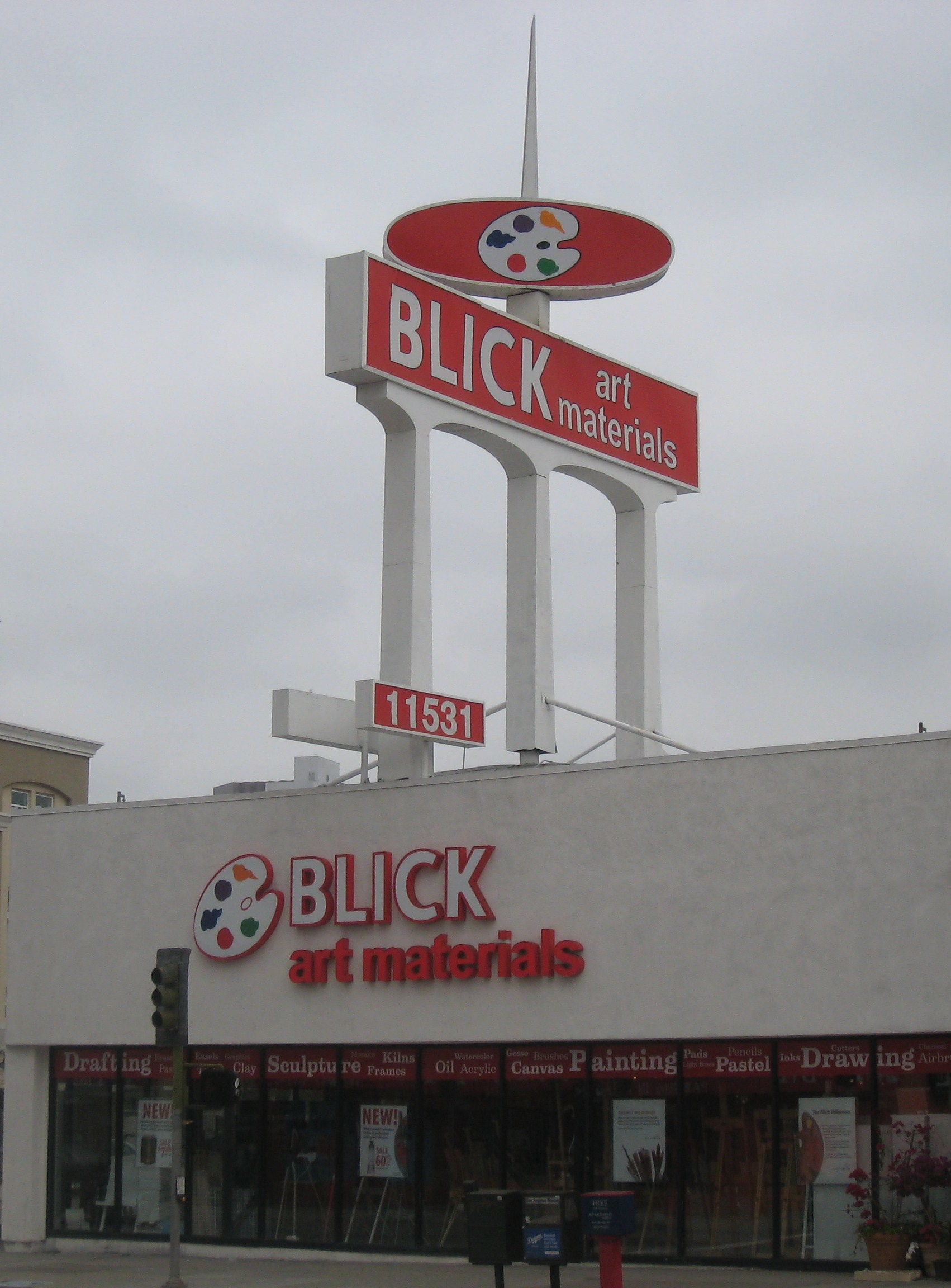
Blick Art Materials store on Santa Monica Boulevard in West Los Angeles, California

Blick Art Materials offers over 110,000 products. Blick's Utrecht brand products include handcrafted paints, mediums, and brushes. The company operates more than 65 retail stores in the United States, including 11 purchased from The Art Store in 2004, and 45 acquired in 2013 from Utrecht Art Supply. Blick Art Materials’ home office is in Highland Park, Illinois, and it operates three distribution centers, two in Galesburg, Illinois, and one in Monroe, New Jersey.

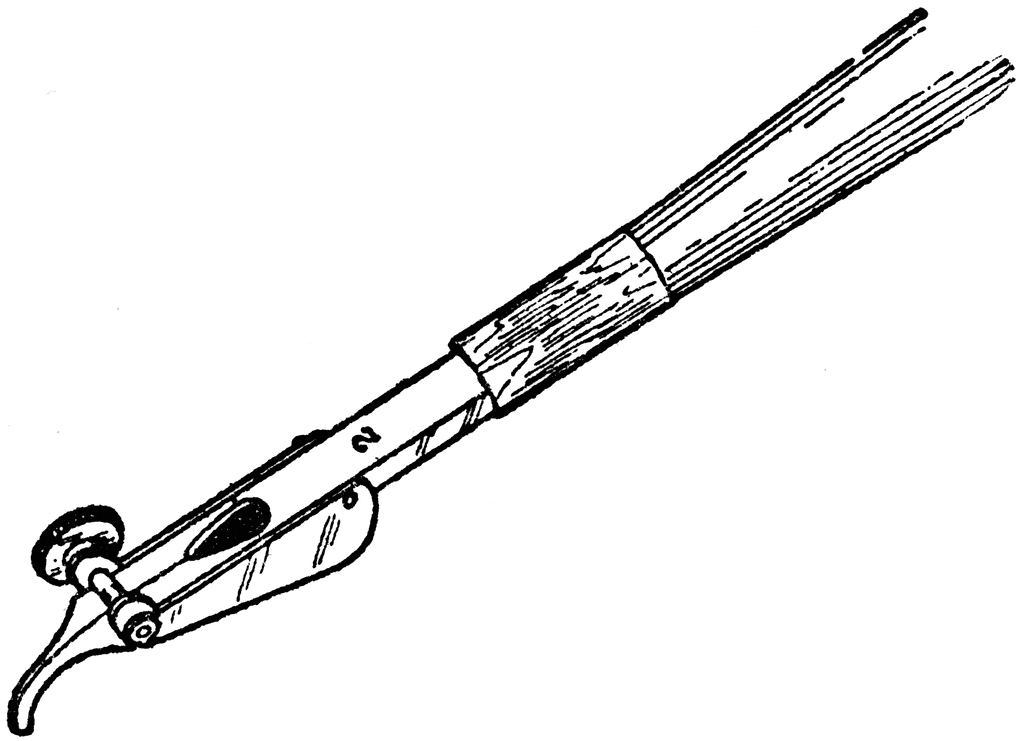
A Payzant pen, Blick's first product

== History ==
Dick Blick and his wife Grace started Dick Blick Company in 1911, working from their kitchen to sell their first product, the Payzant pen, by mail order. Robert Metzenberg purchased the company in 1947. Its parent company is Dick Blick Holdings, Inc., founded by Blick and Metzenberg. Metzenberg expanded the company, opening mail order offices in Las Vegas, Nevada; Hartford, Connecticut; and Allentown, Pennsylvania. He opened the first Blick retail store in Galesburg, Illinois, in 1974. He also established retail outlets in Las Vegas, Allentown, and Dearborn, Michigan. Metzenberg's grandson, Robert Buchsbaum, became CEO in 1996.

In 2013, the company acquired Utrecht and dropped the "Dick" from its name, becoming Blick Art Materials. The Business Committee for the Arts, a division of Americans for the Arts, honored Buchsbaum with its 2016 Leadership Award, for "extraordinary vision, leadership, and commitment to supporting the arts and for encouraging other businesses to follow their lead."

In 2026, the company acquired Plaza Artist Materials and Picture Framing of the Mid-Atlantic.
