= Jean-François Boyvin de Bonnetot =

French inventor

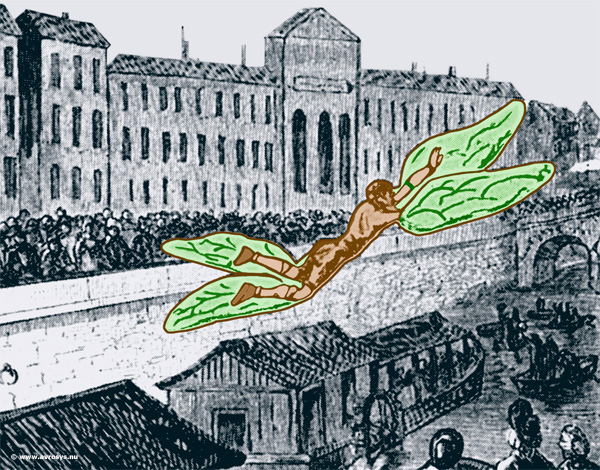
March 19, 1742

Jean-François Boyvin de Bonnetot, Marquis de Bacqueville (1688 – Paris, 7 October 1760), was a French inventor from Bacqueville-en-Caux, Province of Normandy.

On March 19, 1742, he flew in a glider over the river Seine. Jean-Jacques Rousseau observed and recorded the event in his biographical book. He equipped himself with wings and attempted to fly off the roof of the hotel. He briefly hovered 300 meters above the Seine before falling into a barge and breaking his leg.

Boyvin died in 1760 in a house fire in Paris.
