= Oil pastel =

Stick consisting of powdered pigment and an oil-based binder

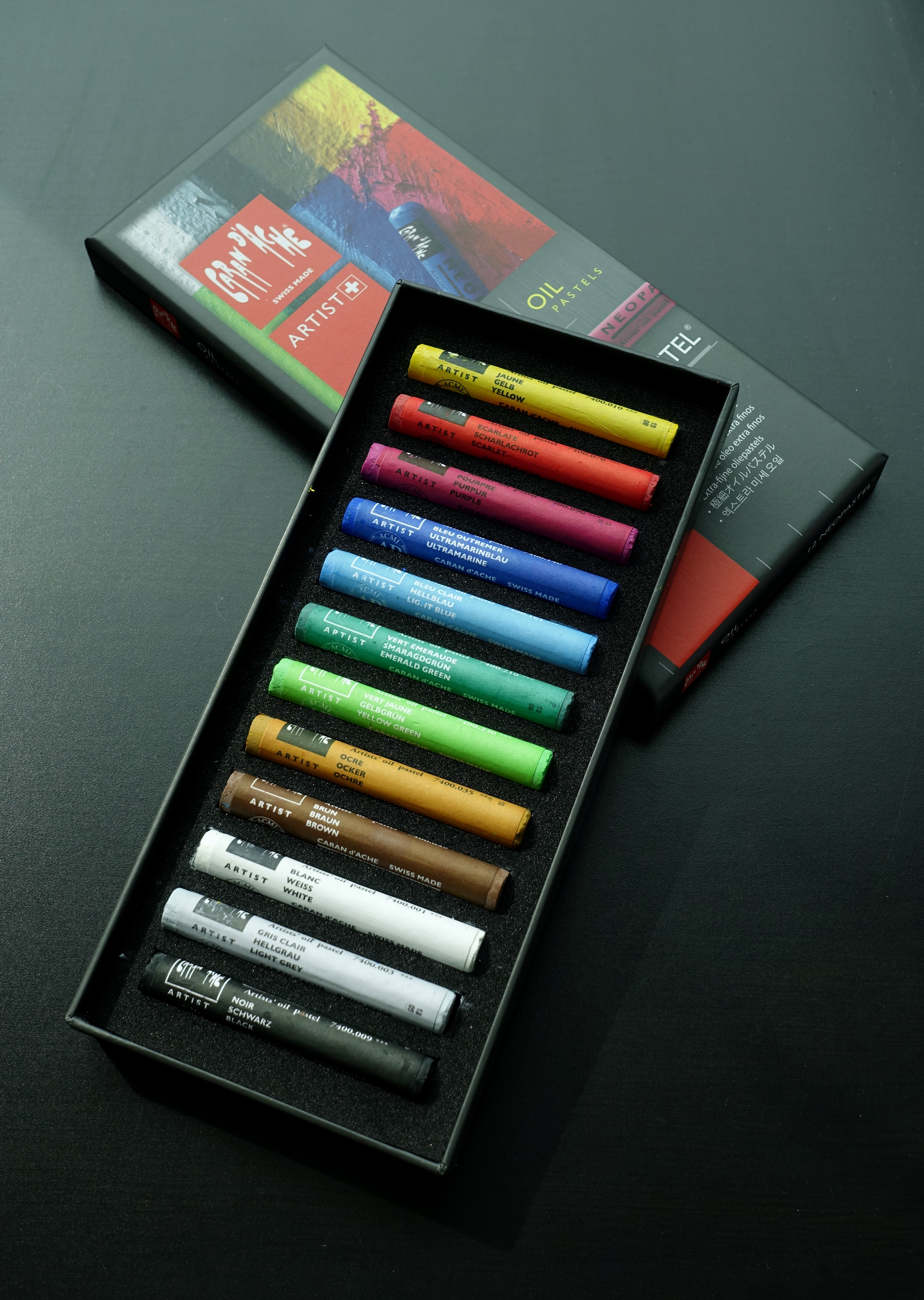
A set of oil pastels

Oil pastel is a type of pastel (an art medium that consists of powdered pigment and a binder) that uses mixture of non-drying oil and wax as binder. It differs from other pastels which are made with a gum or methyl cellulose binder, and from wax crayons which are made without oil. The surface of an oil pastel painting is less powdery than one made from other pastels, but more difficult to protect with a fixative. The colors of oil pastels are highly saturated and bright. They can be blended easily but they can break easily too.

== History ==
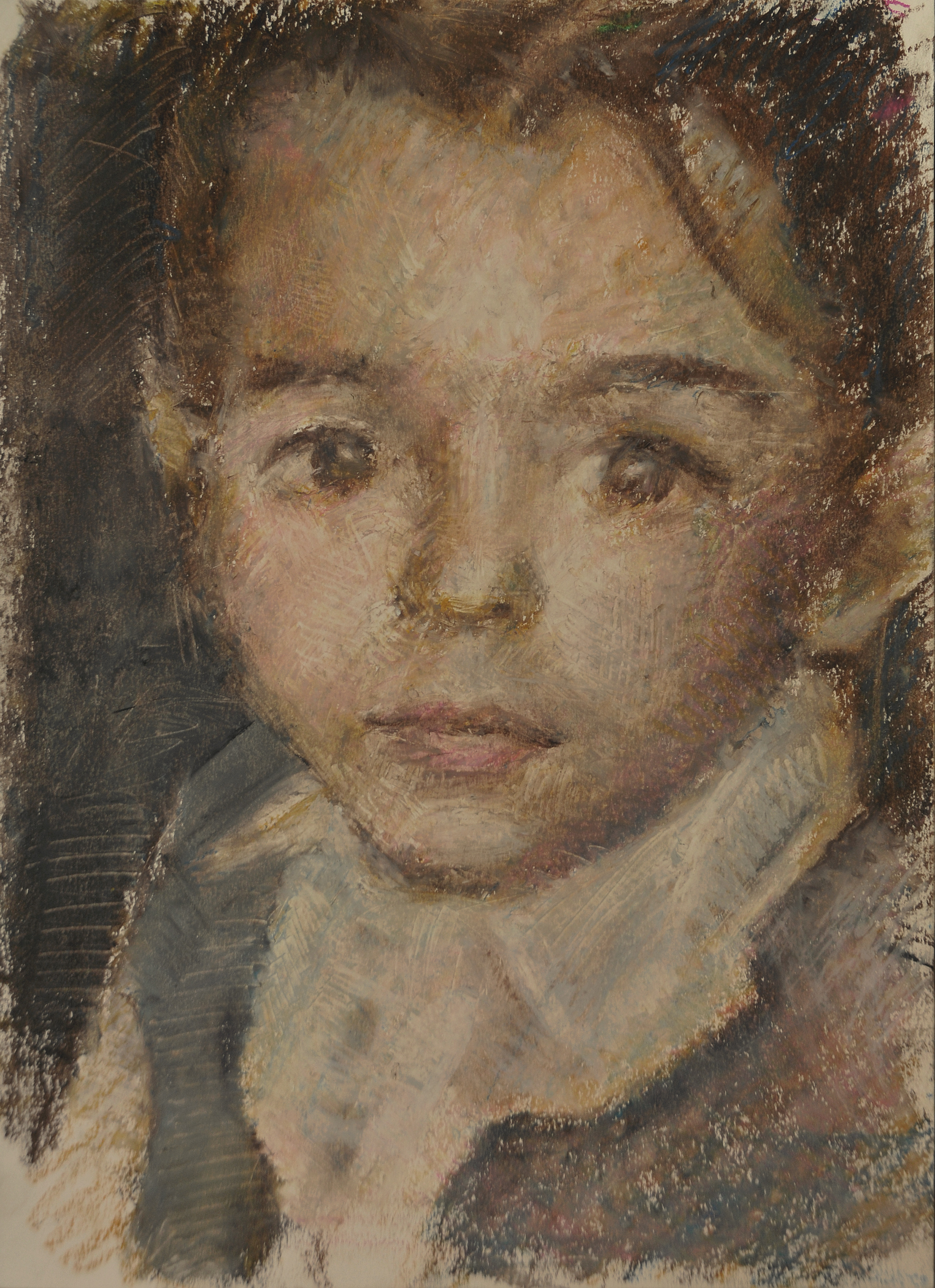
Portrait of a child made from oil pastels.

At the end of World War I, Kanae Yamamoto proposed an overhaul of the Japanese education system. He thought that it had been geared too much towards uncritical absorption of information by imitation and wanted to promote a less restraining system, a vision he expounded in his book Theory of self-expression which described the Jiyu-ga method, "learning without a teacher". Teachers Rinzo Satake and his brother-in-law Shuku Sasaki read Yamamoto's work and became fanatical supporters. They became keen to implement his ideas by replacing the many hours Japanese children had to spend drawing ideograms with black Indian ink with free drawing hours, filled with as much color as possible. For this, they decided to produce an improved wax crayon and in 1921 founded the Sakura Cray-Pas Company and began production.

The new product was not completely satisfactory, as pigment concentration was low and blending was impossible, so in 1924 they decided to develop a high viscosity crayon: the oil pastel. This used a mixture of mashed paraffin wax, stearic acid and coconut oil as a binder. Designed as a relatively cheap, easily applied, colorful medium, oil pastels granted younger artists and students a greater freedom of expression than the expensive chalk-like pastels normally associated with the fine arts. Until the addition of a stabiliser in 1927, oil pastels came in two types: winter pastels with additional oil to prevent hardening and summer pastels with little oil to avoid melting. State schools could not afford the medium and, suspicious of the very idea of "self-expression" in general, favoured the colored pencil, a cheaper German invention then widely promoted in Europe as a means to instill work discipline in young children.

Oil pastels were an immediate commercial success and other manufacturers were quick to take up the idea, such as Dutch company Talens, who began to produce Panda Pastels in 1930. However, none of these were comparable to the professional quality oil pastels produced today. These early products were intended to introduce western art education to Japanese children, and not as a fine arts medium, although Sakura managed to persuade some avant-garde artists to acquaint themselves with the technique, among them Pablo Picasso.

In 1947, Picasso, who for many years had been unable to procure oil pastels because of the war conditions, convinced Henri Sennelier, a French manufacturer who specialized in high quality art products, to develop a fine arts version. In 1949, Sennelier produced the first oil pastels intended for professionals and experienced artists. These were superior in wax viscosity, texture and pigment quality and capable of producing more consistent and attractive work. Picasso requested that these be produced in 48 different colors.

The Japanese Holbein brand of oil pastels appeared in the mid-1980s with both student and professional grades; the latter with a range of 225 colors.

== Use ==
Oil pastels may be used directly in dry form; when done lightly, the resulting effects are similar to oil paints. Heavy build-ups can create an almost impasto effect. Once applied to a surface, the oil pastel pigment can be manipulated with a brush moistened in white spirit, turpentine, linseed oil, or another type of vegetable oil or solvent. Alternatively, the drawing surface can be oiled before drawing or the pastel itself can be dipped in oil. Some of these solvents pose serious health concerns.

Oil pastels are easy to paint with and convenient to carry. For this reason they are often used for sketching, though they may also be used for sustained works. Because oil pastels never dry out completely, works are often protected by applying a special fixative to the painting or by placing the painting in a sleeve before framing.

The medium has known durability problems:

- Because the oil does not dry, it continues to permeate the paper. This process degrades both the paper and the color layer as it reduces the flexibility of the latter.
- The stearic acid in the oil tends to make paper brittle
- Both the stearic acid and the wax are prone to efflorescence or "wax bloom", the building-up of fatty acids and wax on the surface into an opaque white layer.

A work is easily made transparent again by gentle polishing with a woolen cloth, but the three issues result in a color layer made up mainly of brittle stearic acid on top of brittle paper, a fragile combination that can easily crumble away.

A long-term concern is simple evaporation: half of the palmitic acid present in a work will have evaporated within 40 years, and within 140 years half of the stearic acid will also have disappeared. Impregnation of the entire art work by beeswax has been evaluated as a conservation measure.

== Surface and techniques ==
An example of the scraping down technique

The surface chosen for oil pastels can have a very dramatic effect on the final painting. Paper is a common surface, but this medium can be used on other surfaces including wood, metal, hardboard (often known as "masonite"), MDF, canvas and glass. Many companies make papers specifically for pastels that are suitable for use with oil pastels.

Building up layers of color with the oil pastel, called layering, is a very common technique. Other techniques include underpainting and scraping down or sgraffito. Turpentine, or similar liquids such as mineral spirits, are often used as a blending tool to create a wash effect similar to some watercolor paintings. Commercially available oil sketching papers are preferred for such technique.

== Grades ==
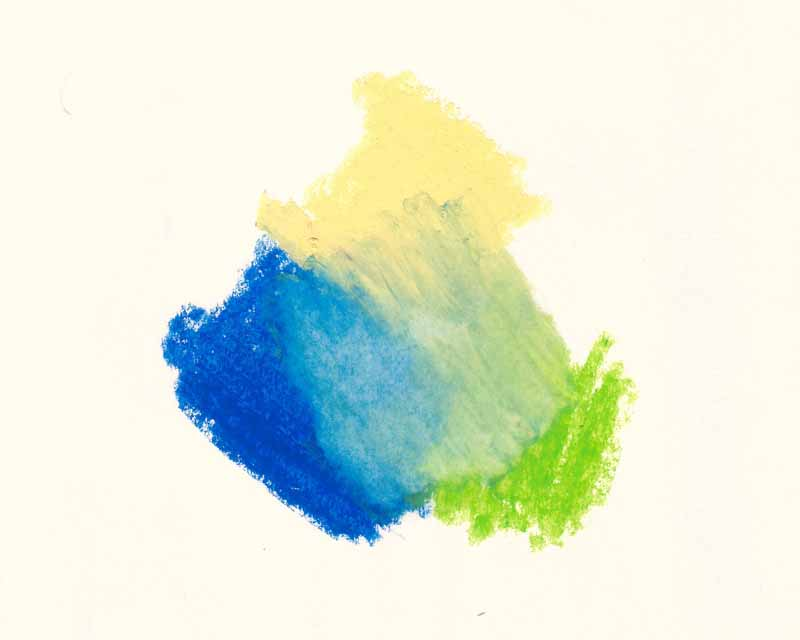
A blended picture using mineral spirits and oil pastels

There are a number of types of oil pastels, each of which can be classified as either scholastic, student or professional grade.

Scholastic grade is the lowest grade; generally the oil pastels are harder and less vibrant than higher grades. It is generally meant for children or new users of oil pastels, and is fairly inexpensive compared to other grades. The middle grade, student grade, is meant for art students and is softer and more vibrant than scholastic grade. They are usually more expensive. Professional grade is the highest grade of oil pastel, and are also the softest and most vibrant, but can be relatively expensive.

== See also ==
- Oil stick
