= Sakura Color Products Corporation =

Japanese manufacturing company

Sakura Color Products Corporation 株式会社サクラクレパス

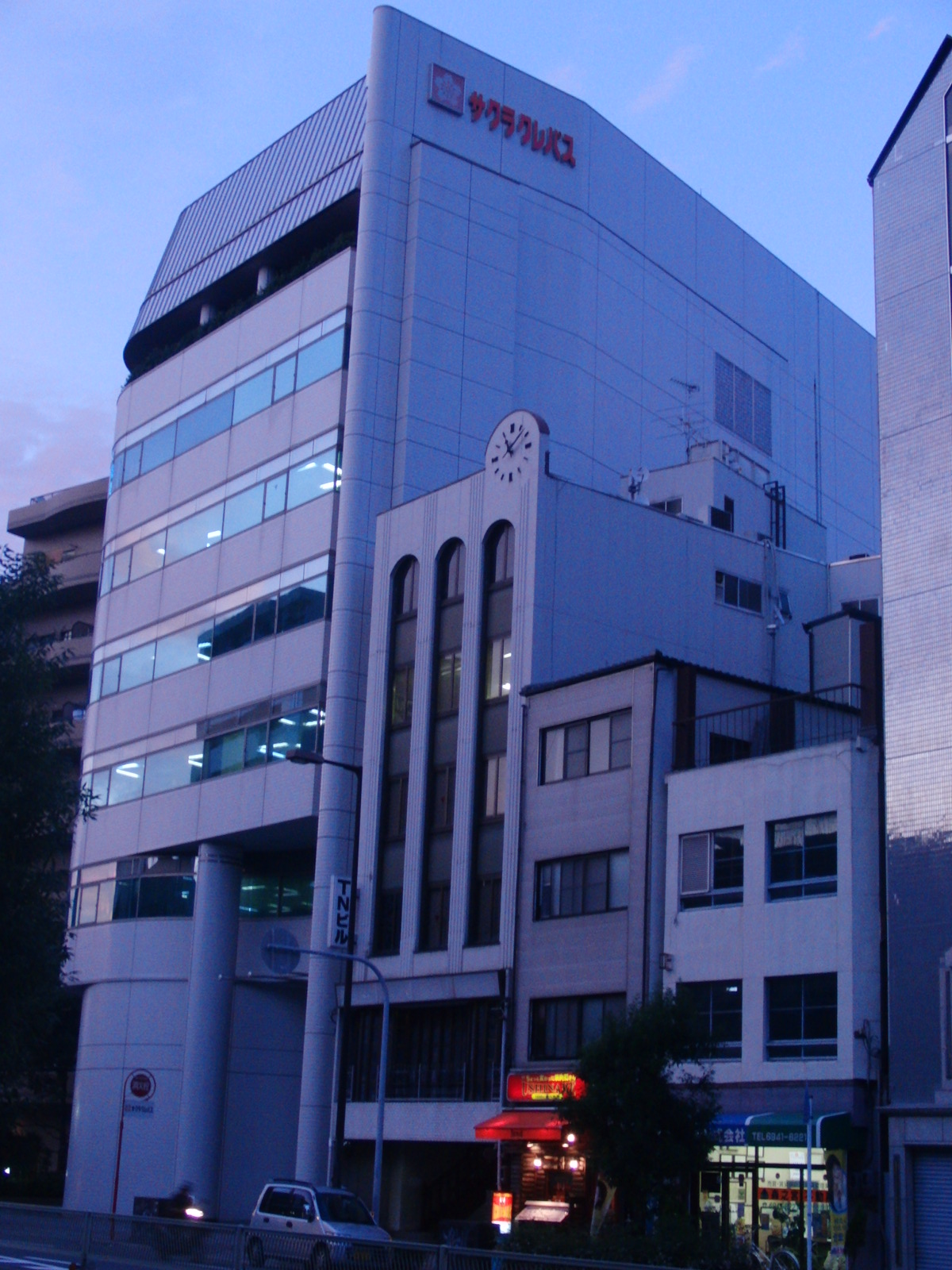
- Sakura headquarters in 2011
- Type: Kabushiki gaisha
- Industry: Stationery; Art materials
- Founded: 1921; 105 years ago in Osaka, Japan
- Headquarters: Morinomiya-chūō, Chuo-ku, Osaka, Japan
- Area served: Worldwide
- Key people: Nishimura Hikoshiro (President)
- Brands: Pigma
- Revenue: ¥ 90 million
- Number of employees: 1,200
- Subsidiaries: List: Talens Japan (Osaka and Tokyo); Shin Nihon Zokei (Tokyo); Daishowa Printing (Osaka); Royal Talens B.V. (Netherlands); Bruynzeel-Sakura B.V. (Netherlands); Sakura Color Products of America, Inc. (US); Shanghai Sakura Stationery (Shanghai, China PR)
- Website: craypas.com

Sakura Color Products Corporation (株式会社サクラクレパス, Kabushiki-gaisha Sakura Kurepasu) is a Japanese manufacturing company headquartered in Morinomiya-chūō, Chūō-ku, Osaka, which produces a variety of stationery products as well a wide range of art materials. Nevertheless, Sakura is mostly known by its marker pens, such as the Pigma line.

== History ==
The company started as a crayon manufacturer in 1921. By 1924, Sakura invented the first-ever oil pastel that combined oil and pigment, which was patented globally as the "Cray-pas (クレパス)" trademark.

In 1982, the firm launched its famous Pigma marker pen lines. In 1984, Sakura invented the first gel-based ink, featured in its new ballpoint pens lines. Gel ink pens are currently produced by many stationery companies.

In 1991 Sakura acquired the Dutch company Royal Talens, and in 1997 the Dutch pencil maker Bruynzeel.

The North-American division of the company, "Sakura Color Products of America, Inc." was established in Hayward, California in 1986. Other division of Sakura in Asia, "Shanghai Sakura International Trading Co., Ltd. (Chinese: 上海櫻花文化用品有限公司)" was established in Shanghai, China in 2002.

== Products ==
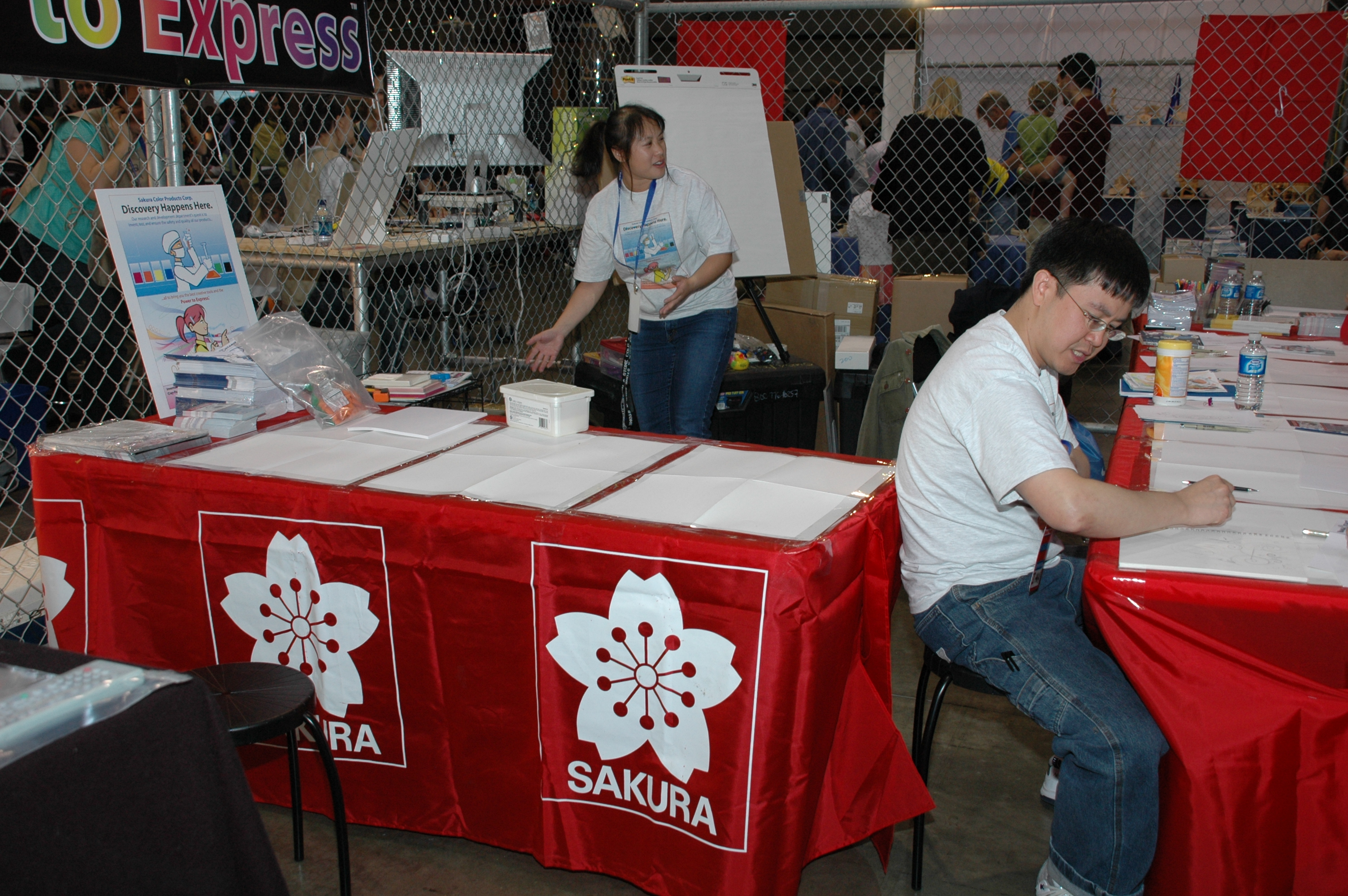
Sakura of America booth at Maker Faire 2008

The following is a list with the large range of products commercialized by Sakura:

Category	Products
Pens	Ballpoint pens, gel ink pens, refills
Pencils	Mechanical pencils, colored pencils
Markers	Water based and permanent marker pens, highlighters, brush pens
Writing accessories	Erasers, whiteboard erasers, glue pens
Art materials	Crayons, pastels, oil pastels, water colors, acrylic paints, gouaches, oil paints, water-soluble printing colors, brushes, palettes

== Cray-Pas Wonderful, Colorful World Contest ==
Sakura of America started the annual national art contest in the United States in 1996. The contest is open to all U.S. students grades K through 8 to create a picture that is drawn mostly with oil pastels, preferably Cray-Pas. The judging is done by separate grade categories: K-2, 3-5 and 6-8. Three winners in each category are medalists and 25 more students are awarded honorable mention. There have been 17,000 submissions each year with winning entries displayed online and some have been published in printed material.
