= Grumbacher =

Art materials company

- Type: Private (1905–1989); Subsidiary (1989-2006); Brand (2006)
- Industry: Art materials
- Founded: 1905; 121 years ago
- Founder: Max Grumbacher
- Fate: Acquired by Sanford L.P. in 1989, then by Chartpak, Inc. in 2006
- Headquarters: Leeds, Massachusetts, United States
- Products: Acrylic paints, oil paints, watercolor paintings, brushes
- Owner: Chartpak, Inc.
- Website: grumbacher.chartpak.com

Grumbacher is an American brand of art materials. Grumbacher offers products for artists including acrylic paints, oil paints, watercolor paints and other painting media, as well as brushes.

== Overview ==
The company was founded in 1905 by Max Grumbacher. It became a subsidiary of Sanford L.P., a Newell Rubbermaid company, until September 2006, when it was acquired by Chartpak, Inc., an art materials and office products company headquartered in Leeds, Massachusetts.

Grumbacher markets both collegiate- and professional-grade artist products.

The collegiate grade products carry the "Academy" name branding. The Academy line currently consists of oil, acrylic, and watercolor paints as well as three brush lines.

The Grumbacher professional product line consists of "Grumbacher MAX", a water-mixable oil paint, which means it can be diluted using water instead of conventional solvents; there are 60 "MAX" colors available. The line also markets "Grumbacher PRETESTED" oil paints (90 colors), which are conventional linseed-oil based paints for professional artists' use. The professional line was rounded out in the spring of 2008 with the return of "Grumbacher FINEST" watercolors (54 colors).

Along with the manufacture of paint, Grumbacher currently produces nine brush lines and a full line of media, grounds, solvents, varnishes and artist accessories.

Grumbacher's current range of watercolors includes the Academy watercolor line, a student line in 7.5ml tubes, and the Finest line, a professional grade of watercolors in 14ml tubes. The colors in both lines offer a diverse palette and are as rich and light-fast as most competitive grade lines. Grumbacher also recently released a superior professional-grade line, called Grumbacher Finest, which had a brief stint as a brand until its name change to Prismacolor watercolors after Grumbacher's acquisition by then new owners Sanford L.P.
