= Sennelier =

French art materials company

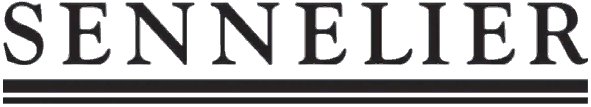
- Company type: Private
- Industry: Art materials
- Founded: 1887; 139 years ago
- Founder: Gustave Sennelier
- Headquarters: France
- Products: Acrylic, oil, watercolor, gouache, pastel, india ink, tempera
- Website: sennelier-colors.com

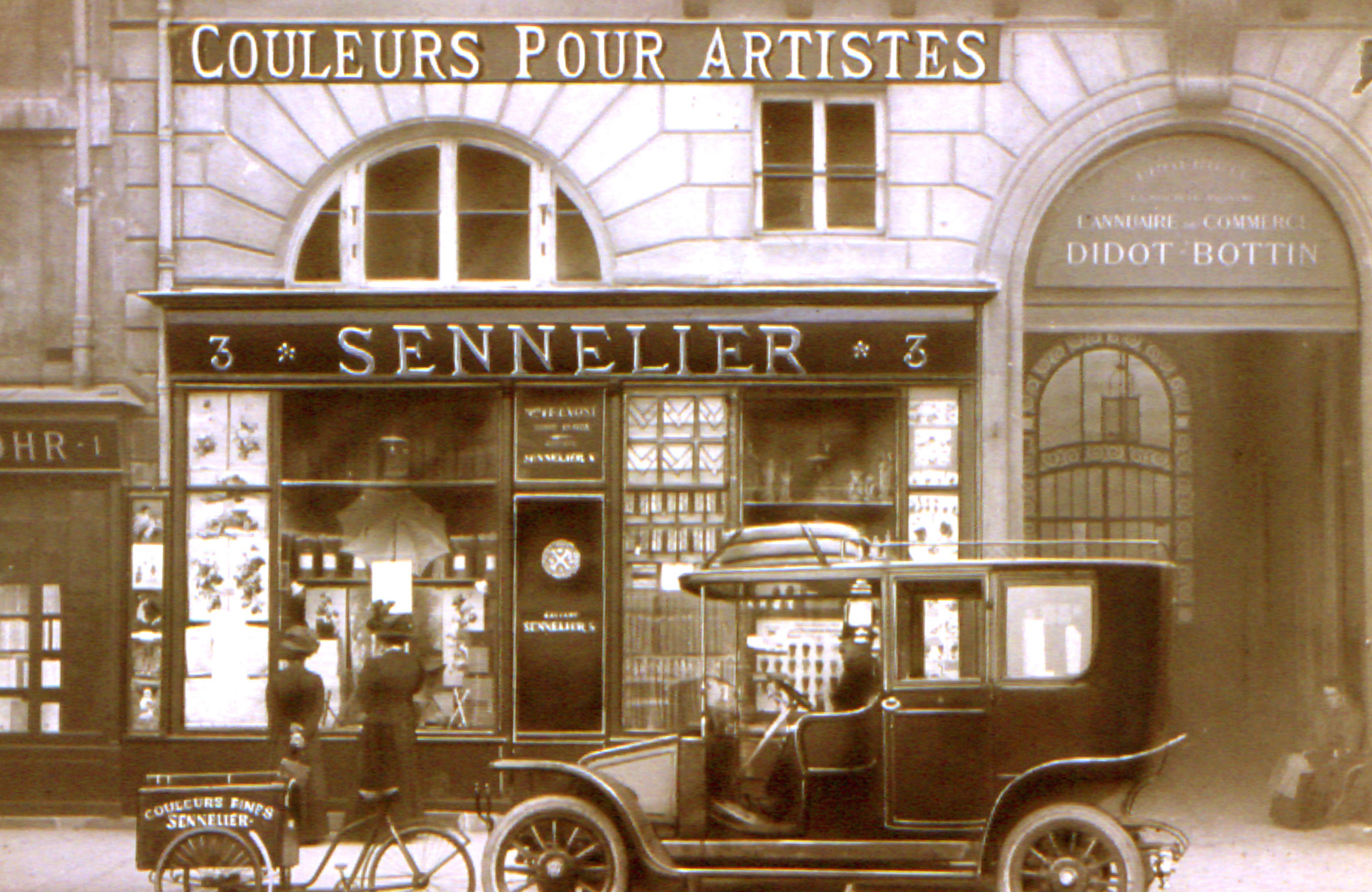
Vintage photo of the shop window of Sennelier.

Sennelier is a French manufacturing company of art materials, mostly famous for its hand selected pigments. The company produces a wide range of paint products, including acrylic, oil, watercolor, gouache, oil and soft pastel, india ink, tempera, and other media.

== History ==
Gustave Sennelier opened this art supply store in 1887, near the famous Ecole des Beaux-Arts. Initially, Sennelier sold paints made by various manufacturers; later he chose to produce his own paints using local pigments and binders procured from his travels across Europe.

Anecdotally, it is believed that Sennelier gained prominence at this time. Art-supply shops were ubiquitous, and Cézanne, Gauguin, and many other artists would shop around in the neighborhood, in search of particular shades of paint. If Gustave Sennelier didn't stock the color, he would create it for his painters.

In 1949, Henri Sennelier, Gustave's son, created the first professional-quality oil pastel for Pablo Picasso. Picasso wanted colors he could use on any surface, without any special preparation. In addition to the aforementioned Cézanne, Gauguin, and Picasso, Vincent van Gogh was also known to have used Sennelier oil paint.

Sennelier is one of just a few companies that still provides dry pigments for sale. Most artists today simply buy ready-mixed paints. The range of dry pure pigments offered by the company is quite large, exceeding eighty colors. The artist can then mix the colors into the preferred medium, creating a range of possibilities. Sennnelier has a website that explains more about these techniques, supported by a number of videos demonstrating the use of the products. It is in French, but allows the user to choose an English translation.
