= Royal Talens =

Dutch company in art materials

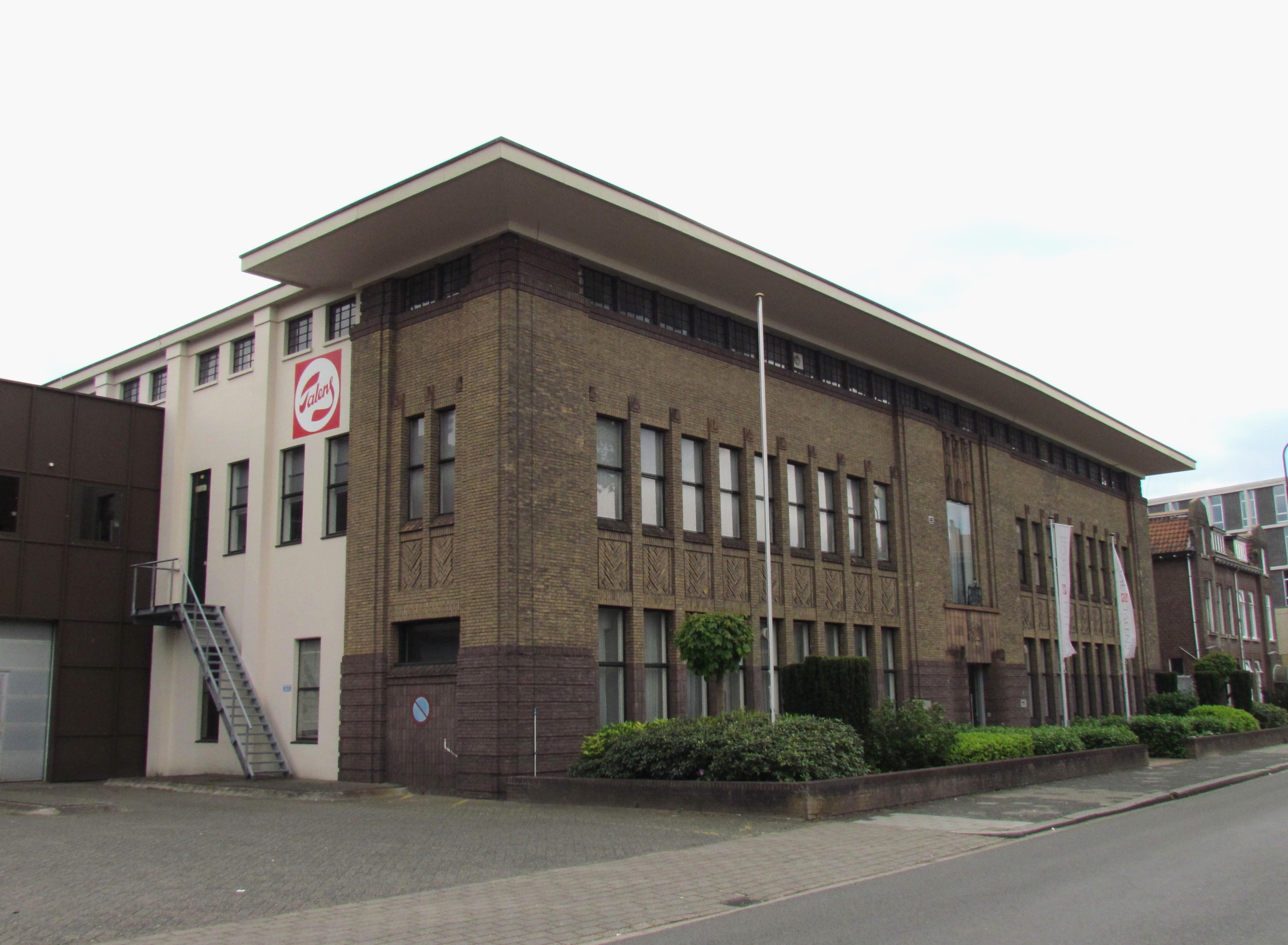
- Royal Talens head office in Apeldoorn
- Formerly: Talens & Co.
- Type: Private (1899–1963); Subsidiary (1963–present)
- Industry: Art materials
- Founded: 1899; 127 years ago
- Founder: Marten Talens
- Fate: Acquired by the Sikkens Group in 1963, then other owners
- Headquarters: Apeldoorn, Netherlands
- Products: Acrylic paints, oil paints, watercolor paintings, brushes, markers, inks, pastels, pencils, gouache, canvas, papers
- Brands: Van Gogh, Rembrandt, Bruynzeel
- Parent: Sakura
- Website: royaltalens.com

Royal Talens is a Dutch company located in Apeldoorn that specializes in art materials. The company produces and markets its own products, apart from commercializing other licensed brands, such as Van Gogh, Rembrandt, and Bruynzeel. Products commercialised include acrylic paints, oil paints, watercolor paintings, brushes, markers, inks, pastels, pencils, pens, gouache, canvas, papers.

In the past, Talens has also produced fountain pen ink, typewriter ribbon, carbon paper and other office supplies.

== History ==
The company was founded in 1899 by former banker Marten Talens, as "Talens & Co.", a Dutch factory that produced paint, varnish and ink. Whilst this initially involved only office supplies, in 1899 it started to produce Rembrandt oil colours as well. In 1904 the company name was changed to "Talens & Zoon", when son Hildebrand Talens became a partner in the business. Exports to the United States and Russia commenced in 1905. In 1912 a sales office opened up in the United States. The factory, too, expanded, and in 1920 it switched to steam power. A local ink factory was also taken over and the company put into operation its own tin factory. In 1927 a new head office was built. The building's architect was P.W. van den Belt, and it now enjoys the status of an industrial monument.

As of 1932 the typewriter became increasingly popular in offices, and the mimeograph became all the rage. Talens started to supply carbon paper, typewriter ribbon, stencils and stencil ink. The brand Gluton, the glue in the famous pot-and-brush, became a household name. During World War II there was a shortage of raw materials, and the factory sustained a great deal of damage by a stray bomb. After the country's liberation the factory started operations once more. In 1949 Talens received the designation 'Koninklijke' ('Royal') and changed its name to "Koninklijke Fabrieken Talens & Zoon" (Royal Works Talens & Son). The subsequent years were characterized by enormous growth for the company, and branches were set up in more than 50 countries.

In 1963 Talens joined the Sikkens Group, which was eventually taken over by AkzoNobel. Royal Talens continued as a subsidiary within this group. In 1970 acrylic paints were launched, and since 1974 Royal Talens has been putting together an art collection. In the years that followed new brands were introduced, and in 1989 a modern new plant was opened.

In 1991 Royal Talens became part of the Sakura Color Products Corporation, a privately owned firm based in Osaka. In 1996 a factory for easels and stretched canvases was set up in the Polish city of Lesko. In 1999 a new distribution hall was built in Apeldoorn. Several new brands and products have since been added to the range.

== Brands ==
Royal Talens is as manufacturer active in the fine art segment with the following brands:

- Talens (oil paint, acrylic paint, watercolor, gouache, brushes, Indian ink, crayons, oil pastels, easels, papers, canvas)
- Amsterdam (acrylic paint, markers, spray paint, accessories)
- Bruynzeel (writing pencils, coloured pencils, felt tips)
- Cobra (water mixable oil colour)
- Rembrandt (oil paint, acrylic paint, pastels, water colour)
- Sakura (gel pens, crayons, pencils, markers, drawing pads)
- Schjerning (hobby paint, textile paint, glass paint)
- Talens | Pantone (markers, paper, marker ink)
- Van Gogh (oil paint, acrylic paint, pastels, water colour)
