= Victoria Works, Birmingham =

Grade II listed building in Birmingham, England

Victoria Works
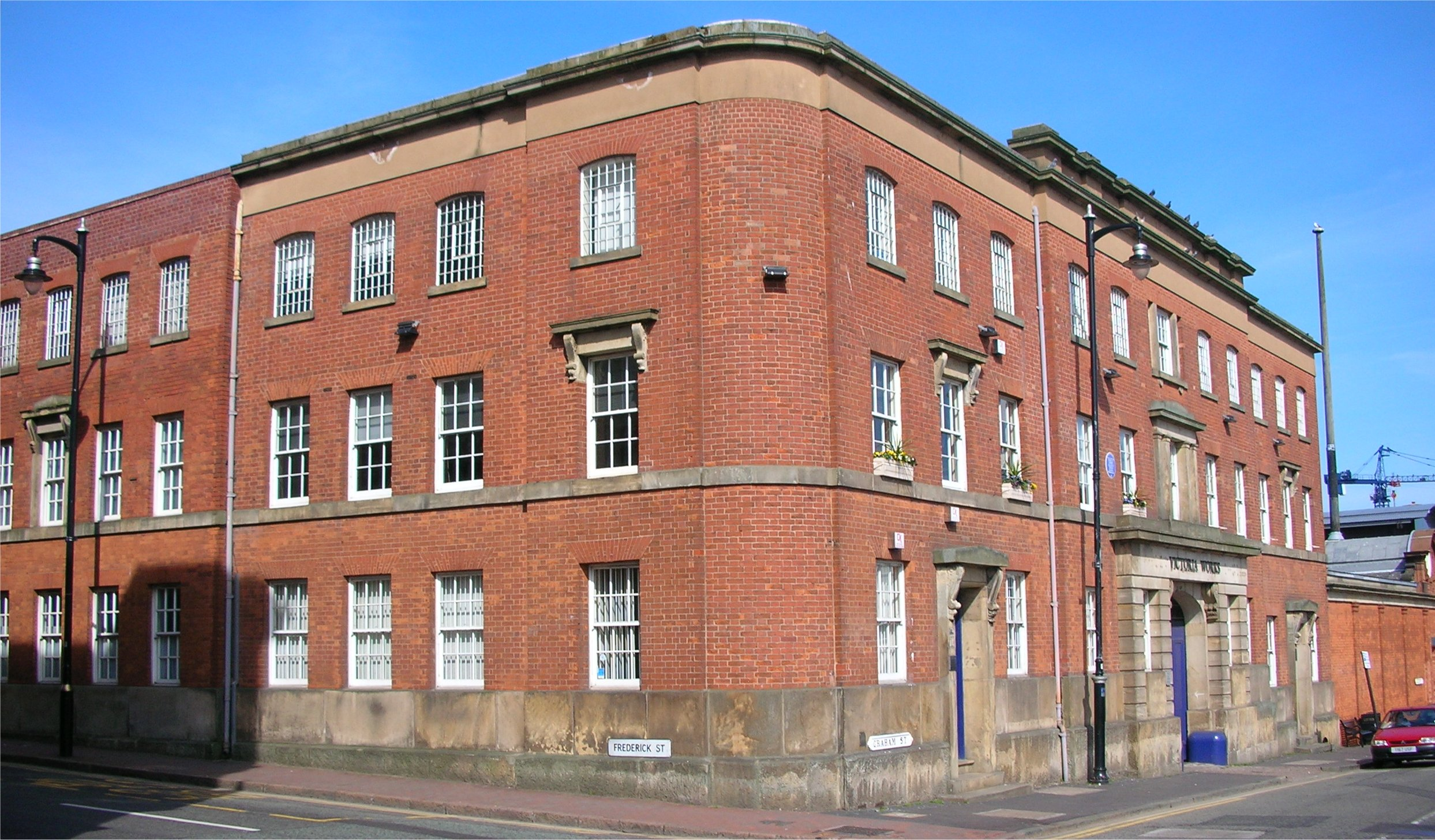
- The building photographed in 2007
- Built: 1839–40
- Operated: 1840–1956
- Location: Graham Street; Birmingham
- Coordinates: 52.4844°N 1.9111°W
- Industry: Metallurgy
- Products: Dip pen
- Employees: 500–600 (1865)
- Architect: Charles Edge
- Owner: Joseph Gillott

The Victoria Works is a former factory and a Grade II listed building in the Jewellery Quarter of Birmingham, England. It was built in 1839–40 for the Joseph Gillott pen company, who manufactured dip pens, and was one of the first purpose-built factories in the Jewellery Quarter.

It is situated opposite the Argent Centre, another building constructed for industrial use around the same period. The factory was one of the largest of its kind, with nearly 600 workers. Steam engines of 60 horsepower powered the mass production of the nibs.

== Overview ==
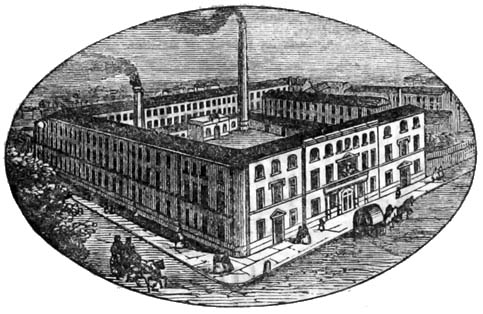
The factory in the 19th. century

Victoria Works was one of the main manufacturing plants during the Birmingham pen trade, a period in the 19th-century that positioned the city of Birmingham was the world's leading manufacturer of steel pens.

Gillott was one of the most prominent manufacturers of that era, along with brothers John and William Mitchell, Josiah Mason, and James Perry.

The book The Shops and Companies of London and the Trades and Manufactories of Great Britain, edited by Henry Mayhew in London in 1865, described the process of manufacturing a pen, also stating that there were between 500 and 600 girls working at the factory.

Gillott produced steel pens at Victoria Works until 1956, when production moved to Dudley. Since then, the building has been occupied by various business (with T. Holland being from 1959 to 1981). In mid 1980s the building was refurbished, and converted into apartments and offices in early 1990s, and houses a mixture of different companies and residents.

== Gallery ==
In 1874, Albert Edward, Prince of Wales and his wife Alexandra visited the Victoria Works. Newspapers The Graphic and The Illustrated London News covered the event with illustrations that showed the factory facilities as well as the manufacturing process of Gillott's pens.

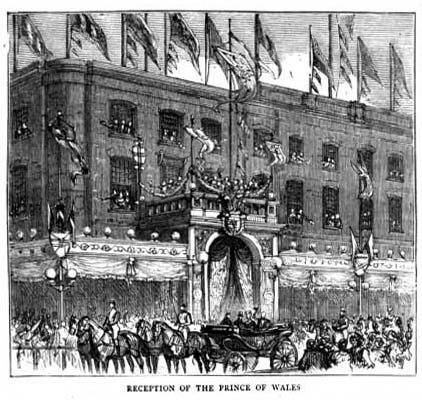
Facade at the arrival

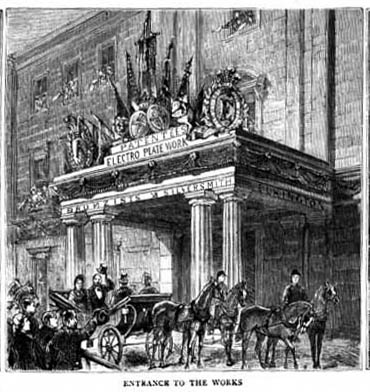
Entrance to the works

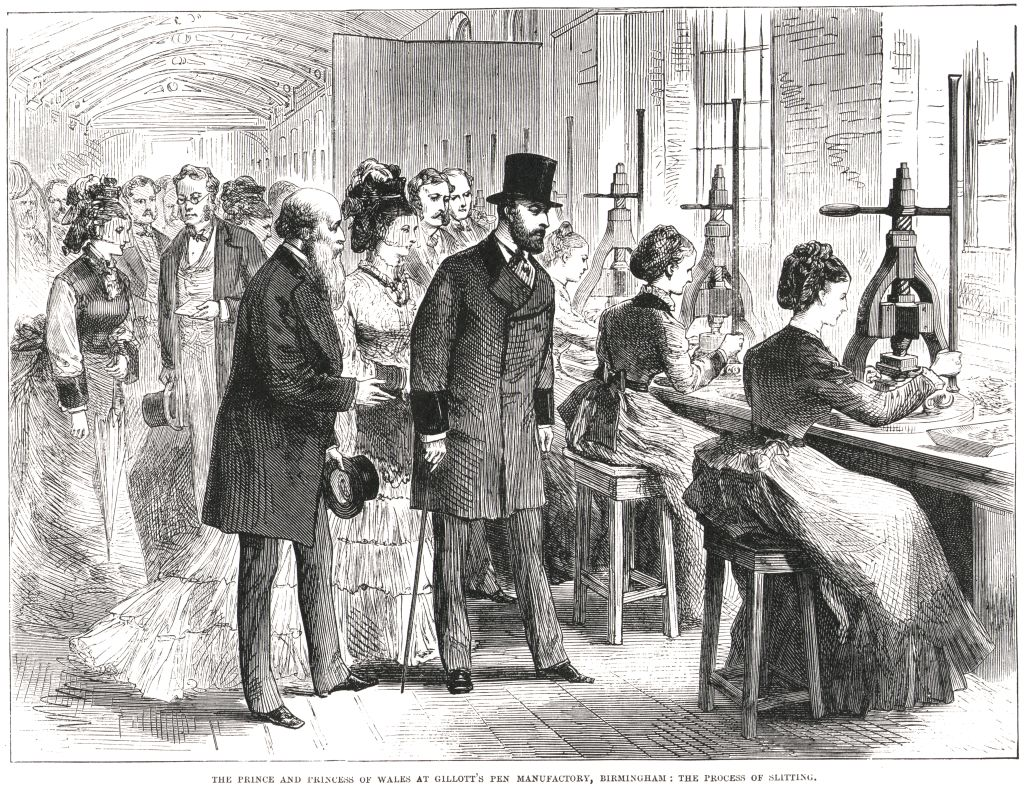
Sliting

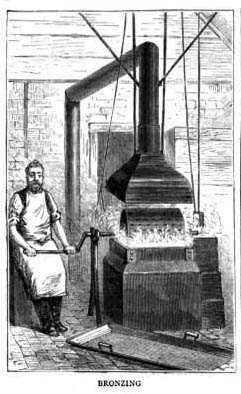
Bronzing

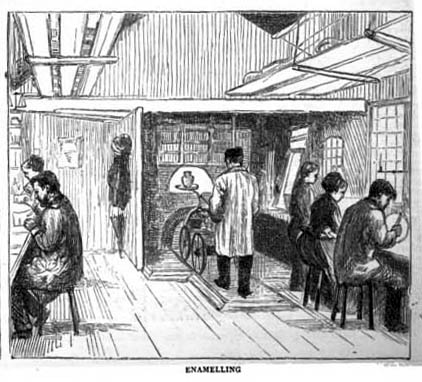
Enamelling

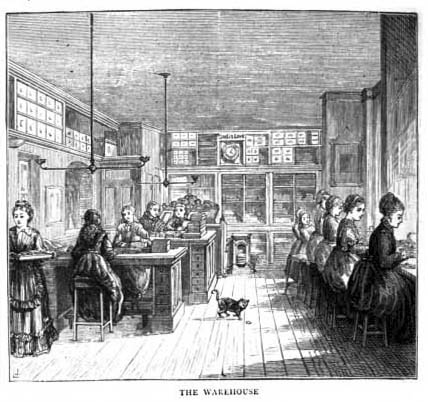
Warehouse

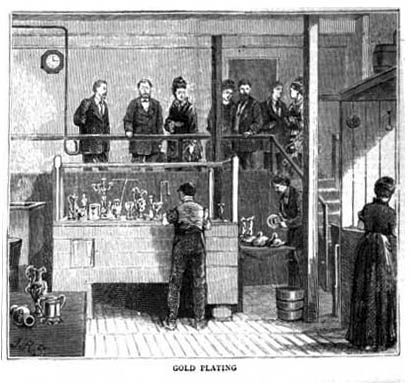
Gold plating

== See also ==
- Grade I listed buildings in the West Midlands
- Birmingham pen trade
