= Victoria foundry =

Victoria foundry, (or works) may refer to:

UK

- Victoria Foundry, Chesterfield. Predecessor to Markham & Co.
- Victoria Foundry, Walmgate, York. 1850s establishment of the Walker Iron Foundry
- Victoria Foundry/works, Bolton. See List of mills in Bolton
- Victoria Foundry, Hyde Bank Road, New Mills, Derbyshire
- Victoria Foundry, Garside Street, Bolton. Foundry of Knight and Wood, predecessor of J & E Wood
- Victoria Works, Tunstall, Staffordshire. Foundry of William Robert Renshaw
- Victoria Works, Birmingham, pen-nib factory built 1840.

Rest of world

- Victoria Foundry, Ottawa
