= Birmingham History Galleries =

Birmingham: Its People, Its History
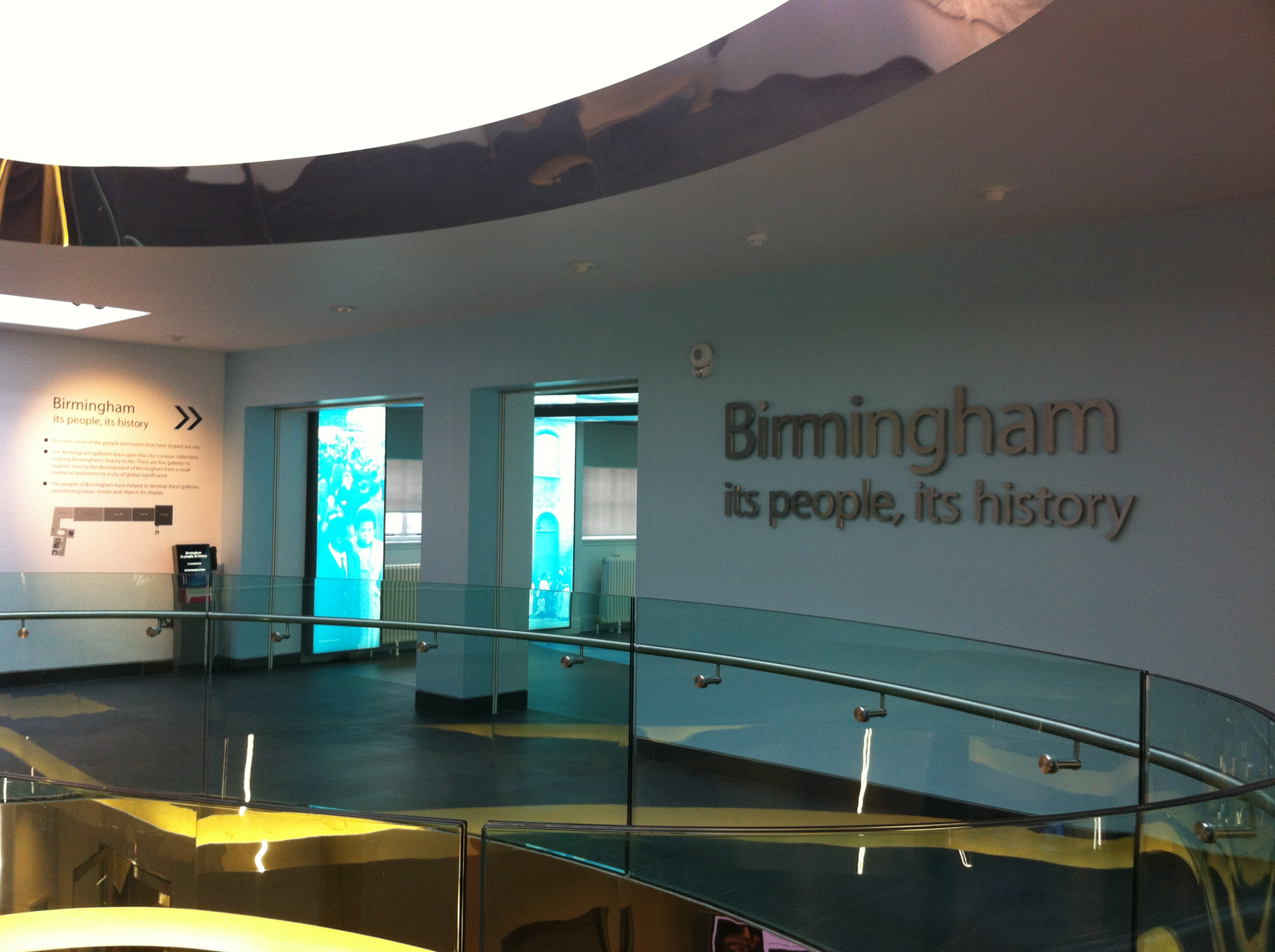
- Entrance to The Birmingham History Galleries.
- Established: 13 October 2012
- Location: Birmingham Museum and Art Gallery
- Collections: Social History
- Collection size: 1,500
- Website: www.bmag.org.uk/new-birmingham-history-galleries

Birmingham, Its people, Its History is a permanent exhibition at Birmingham Museum and Art Gallery and is also unofficially known as the Birmingham History Galleries. It opened to the public in October 2012 and is located on the third floor of the museum covering an area of 1,040 square metres. The exhibition is divided into five galleries which explore the story of Birmingham, England, and its people over a period of 900 years, from the 12th century to the present day. Over 1,500 objects are displayed from the museum's designated collections, many of which can be seen on the museum's Flickr account. The £8.9m capital development was principally funded by the Heritage Lottery Fund, but other funders also include Arts Council England, The Wolfson Foundation and Birmingham City Council. The galleries were designed by Redman Design of Ilkley, Yorkshire, in collaboration with the curatorial department at Birmingham Museum and Art Gallery.

== Layout ==
The galleries are chronological in design, but within each section the history of Birmingham is explored thematically, thereby maximizing the use of space.

=== Origins ===
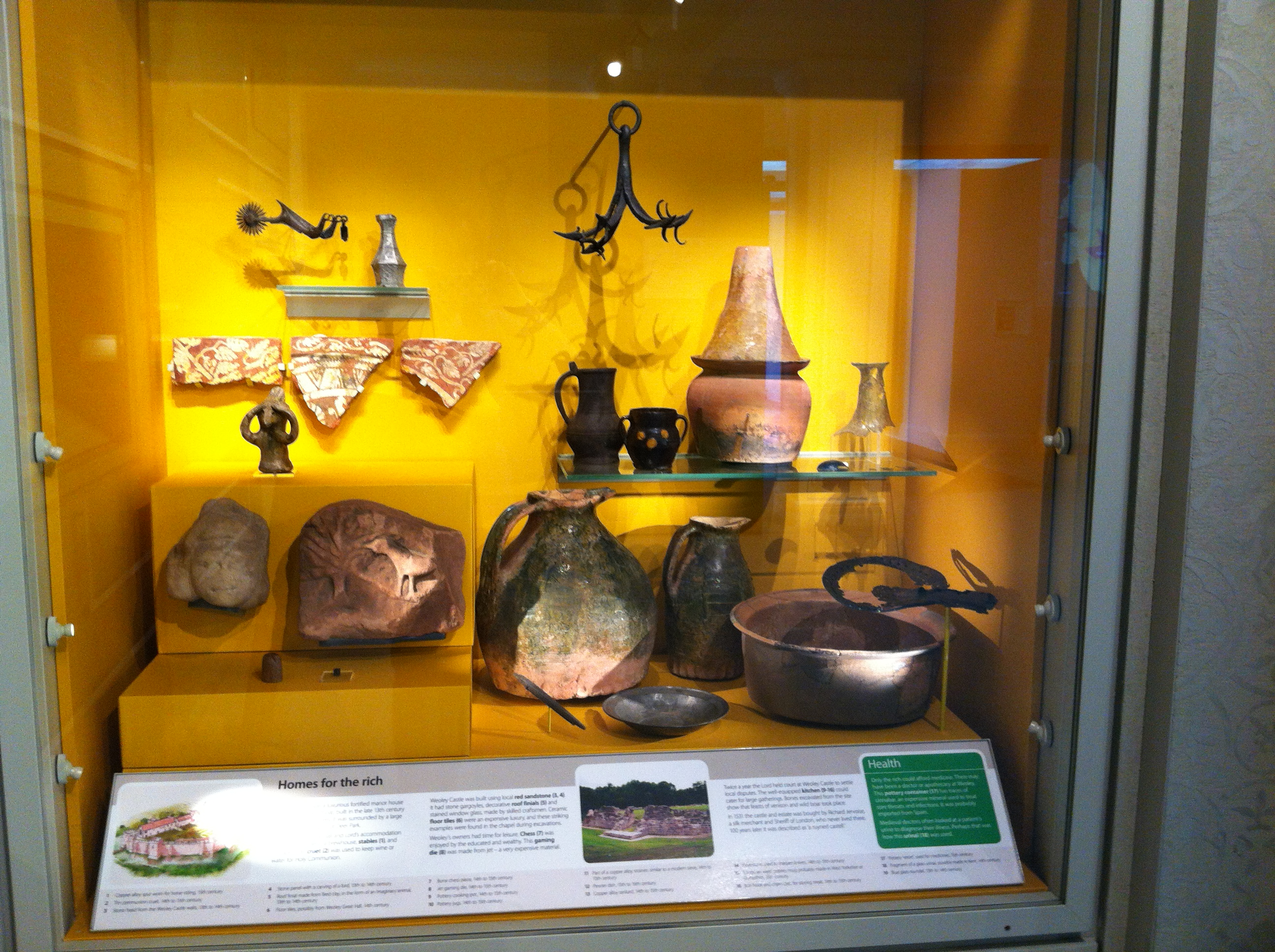
Objects excavated at Weoley Castle, now on display in The Birmingham History Galleries.

Origins is the first gallery in the chronological sequence and although referred to as the medieval gallery, this section explores Birmingham's history from the 12th century through to the end of the 17th century. A Paleolithic handaxe, around 250,000 years old is also displayed here to emphasise how long people have been roaming through the area of what was to become Birmingham. However, due to limited space and the fact that Birmingham's growth did not begin until the 12th century when the medieval market was established, this section principally focuses on its history thereafter. The narrative of the gallery explores Birmingham's success as a market town as a result of its lord of the manor purchasing a market charter in 1166, which secured its future as an important trading centre. Many of the objects on display were discovered during the Bull Ring excavations between 1998 and 2000 and demonstrate how successful Birmingham's market already was by the 12th and 13th centuries, with a variety of established trades such as pottery making and tanning.

=== A Stranger’s Guide ===
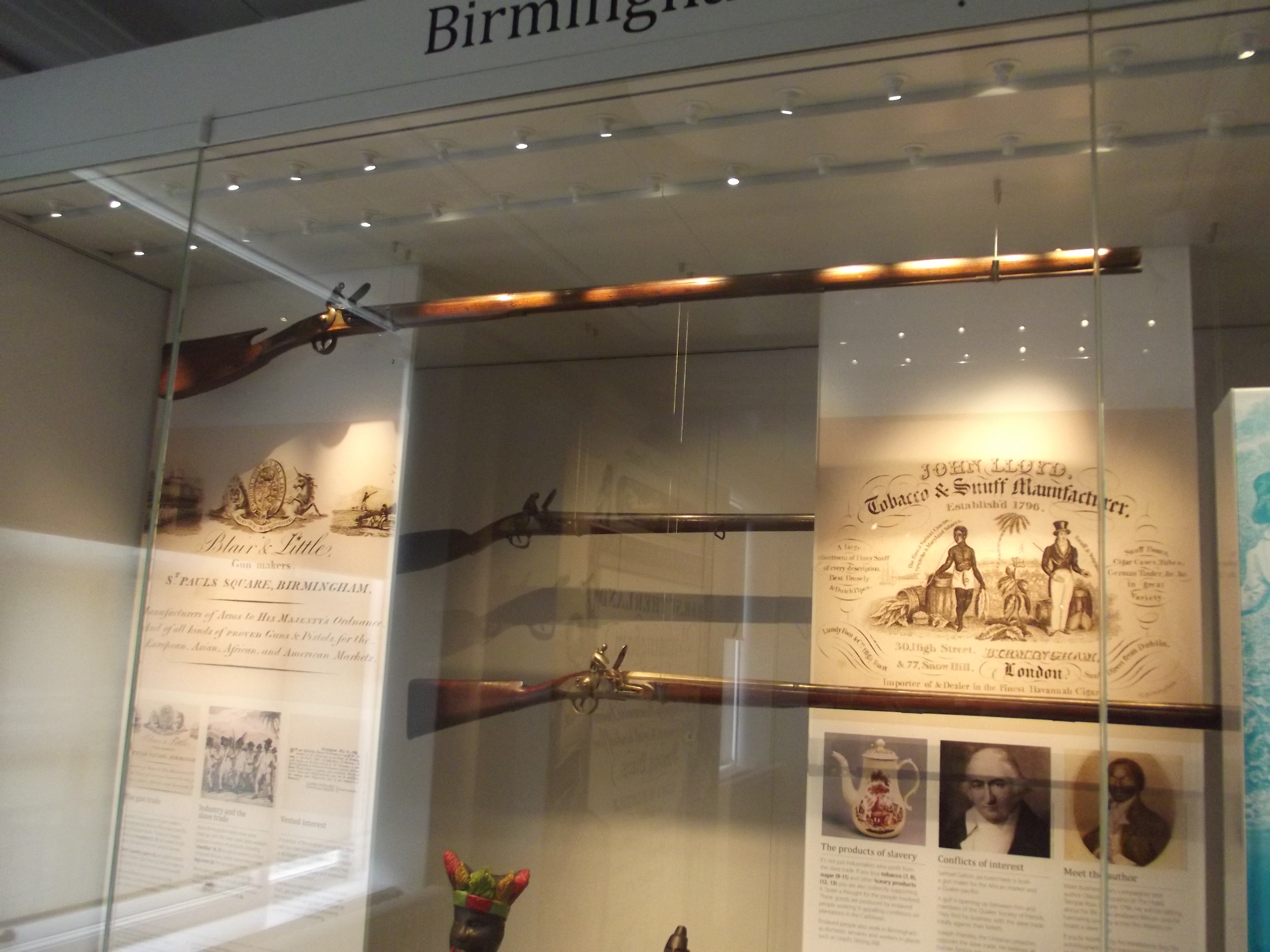
Slaving guns. In the second half of the 18th century, Europeans sold 300,000 rifles a year in Africa, half being produced by Birmingham, maintaining the endemic state of war in which men, who were taken prisoner, were sold to supply the demand for slaves.

A Stranger’s Guide is the second of the five history galleries and focuses on the period between 1700 and 1830. It presents this period as a travel guide for the first-time visitor, offering advice on the best places to stay, work, spend your leisure time and even highlights the many local people you are likely to encounter, including the likes of John Baskerville and Matthew Boulton. Such advice includes informing visitors of the many employment opportunities available to them depending on age, gender, skills and experience from heavy-metal working to detailed craftsmanship of gun engraving.

=== Forward ===
Forward explores life principally in 19th-century Birmingham between the period of 1830 to 1909. This was a point when Birmingham had become an industrial powerhouse, manufacturing everything from pen nibs to steam pumps. The domed part of this gallery is presented as a trade exhibition, focusing on particular Birmingham companies such as Joseph Gillott & Sons Ltd and displaying examples of what they once made. While Birmingham had cultivated a national as well as an international reputation for itself during this period, Forward juxtaposes this success against the dire poverty experienced by many living in the town, and eventually, the city. In addition the gallery also looks at how Birmingham's successful entrepreneurs such as Thomas Attwood, devoted time and resources to social reform and were thus able to improve the living and working conditions of many people. In this way the gallery explores how Birmingham had earned itself a place in national politics, through demanding representation in Parliament to campaigning for the abolition of slavery.

=== An Expanding City ===
This section explores two key aspects of Birmingham's history during the first half of the 20th century between 1909 and 1945. This includes the development of the suburbs and the impact of the two world wars on Birmingham and its people. The first part of the display called A Vision for Birmingham examines how the suburban estate reflected the changing social and political ideals of the time in an attempt to improve the way people lived. In addition, the narrative focuses on the movement of the population to municipal estates, the experiences of tenants and the challenges that arose from building new communities from scratch.

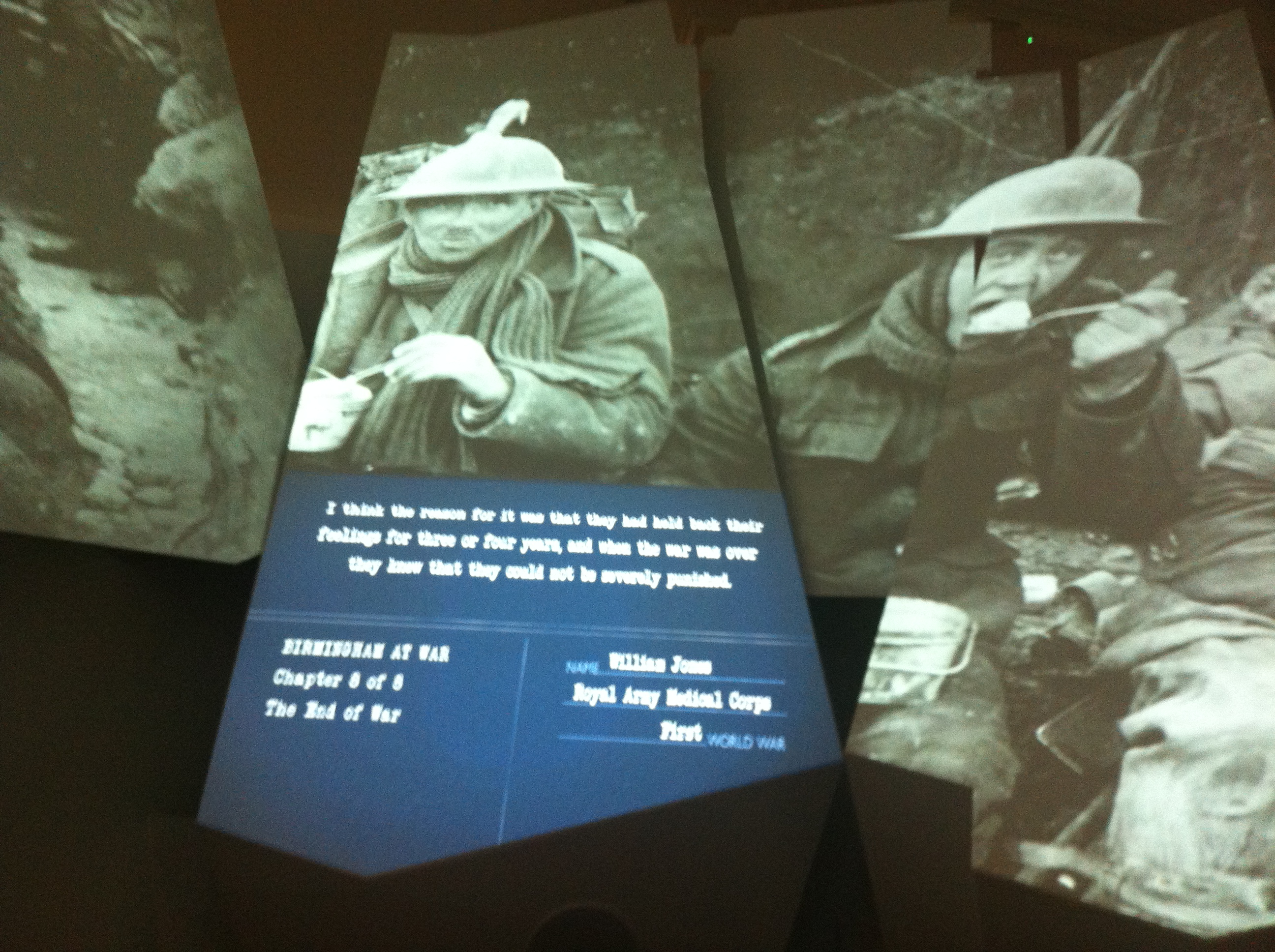
War installation in An Expanding City at Birmingham Museum and Art Gallery.

The second part of this section is called Birmingham at War and reveals the experiences of local people during the first and World War IIs. An immersive Installation presents a collection of over thirty oral testimonies from local people's experiences on both the home and military fronts. They have been incorporated alongside a selection of projected digital images of relevant media from both wars including photographs and newspaper articles.

=== Your Birmingham ===
The last of the five galleries, Your Birmingham, focuses on the city's development after 1945 and features a series of personal objects donated or loaned from people alongside their oral testimonies. It is split into thematic sub-sections, exploring places, events and people. The stories on display offer insights into what it was like to live and work in the city since 1945 to the present day. For instance, local poet, Benjamin Zephaniah’s typewriter can be seen in the gallery alongside an oral history in which he talks about growing up and living in Birmingham and how this influenced his career. One of the original HP Sauce Factory signs can also be seen on display in this gallery. A programme of active collecting is taking place to expand the collection and enable more local people to share and feature their stories and objects in the gallery in the future.

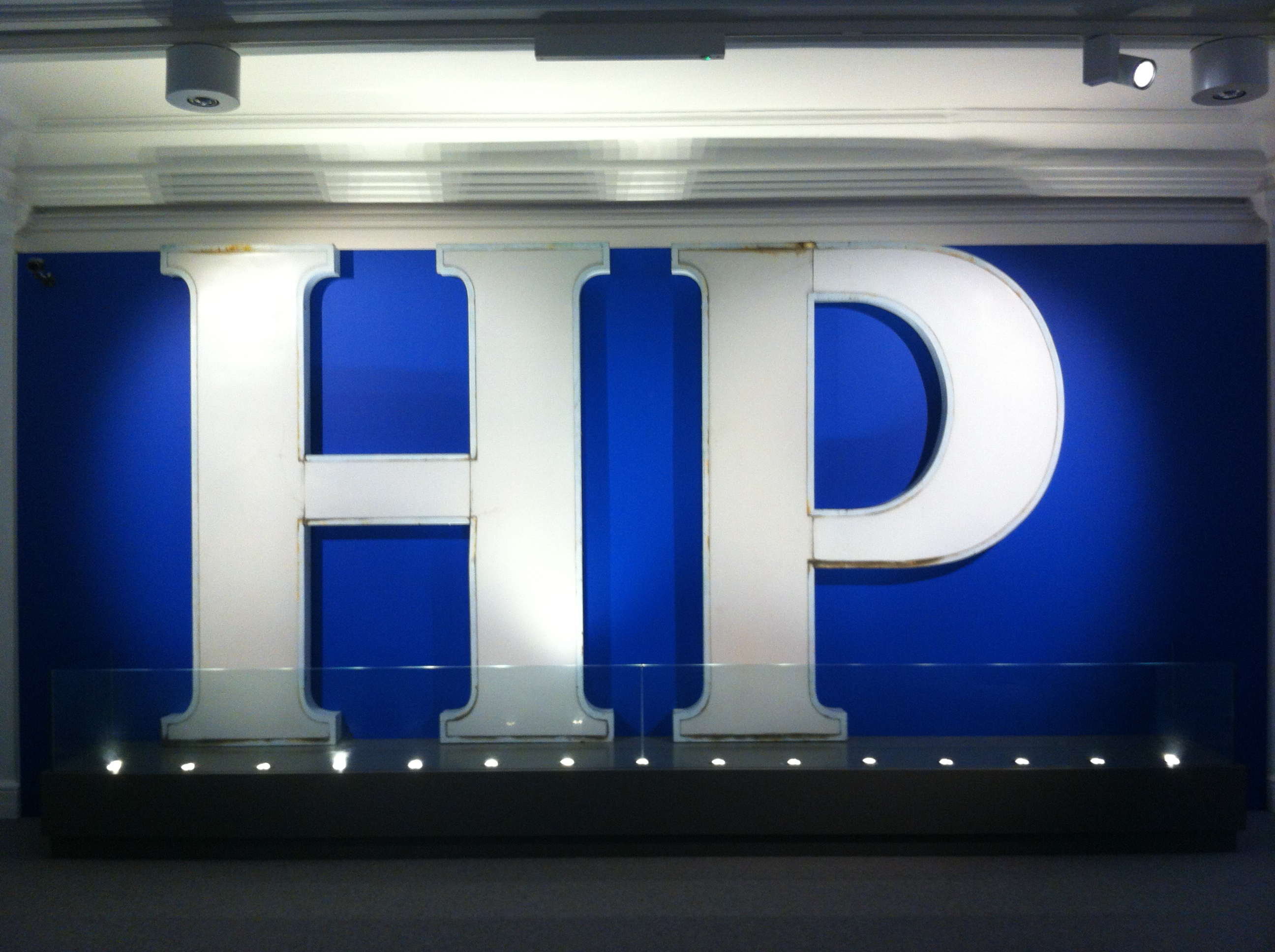
One of the HP Sauce signs from the HP Sauce Factory, removed when the building was demolished in 2007.
