= Josiah Mason =

British businessman (1795–1881)

Sir Josiah Mason
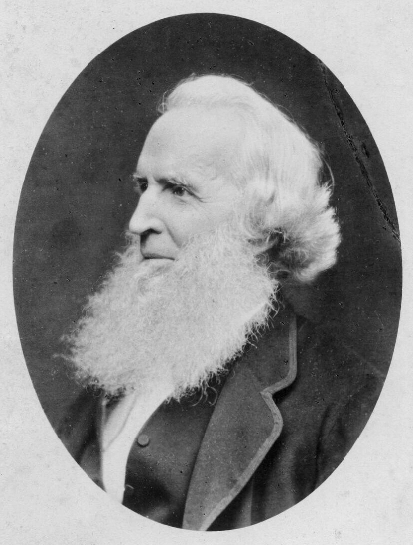
- Portrait of Mason by Henry Penn, 1870
- Born: 23 February 1795; Mill Street, Kidderminster, England
- Died: 16 June 1881 (aged 86)
- Monuments: Statue by Francis John Williamson (1885, destroyed); Bust cast from statue by William Bloye (1952, at Erdington)
- Occupation: Industrialist
- Known for: Founder of the Josiah Mason dip pen company; Philanthropy

Sir Josiah Mason (23 February 1795 – 16 June 1881) was an English industrialist, engaged in dip pen manufacture and other trades, and a philanthropist. He founded Mason Science College in 1875, which later became the University of Birmingham.

== Biography ==
He was the son of a carpet-weaver, and was born in Mill Street, Kidderminster. He began life as a street hawker of cakes, fruits and vegetables. After trying his hand in his native town at shoemaking, baking, carpentering, blacksmithing, house-painting and carpet-weaving, he moved in 1816 to Birmingham. Here he found employment in the gilt-toy trade. In 1824 he set up on his own account as a manufacturer of split-rings by machinery, to which he subsequently added the making of steel pens. Owing to the circumstance of his pens being marketed through James Perry (founder of Perry & Co., the London stationer whose name they bore) he was less well known than Joseph Gillott and other makers, although he was really the largest producer in England, contributing heavily to the Birmingham pen trade.

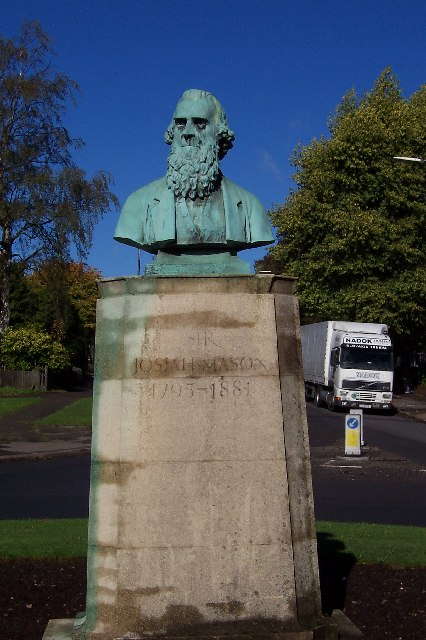
Bust by William Bloye, made from a (destroyed) statue by Francis John Williamson

In 1874 the business was converted into a limited liability company. Besides his steel-pen trade, Mason carried on for many years the business of electro-plating, copper-smelting, and India-rubber ring making, in conjunction with George Elkington.

Mason was almost entirely self-educated, having taught himself to write when a shoemaker's apprentice, and in later life he felt his deficiencies keenly. It was this which led him in 1860 to establish his great orphanage at Erdington, near Sutton Coldfield, some 6 miles from Birmingham. Upon it he expended about £300,000, and for this munificent endowment he was knighted in 1872. He had previously given a dispensary to his native town and an almshouse to Erdington. In 1880 Mason College, since incorporated in the University of Birmingham, was opened. The total value of the endowment was about £250,000.

In commemoration of him, his bust stands at the centre of the roundabout at the junction of Chester Road & Orphanage Road in Erdington (52.531556°N 1.825128°W). This bronze bust was cast in 1951 by William Bloye from a marble statue by Francis John Williamson in 1885, which stood opposite Mason Science College in Edmund Street, but which has since been destroyed. Williamson's statue was erected posthumously, Mason having vetoed its creation during his lifetime. The bust is often "dressed" on special occasions and seasonal holidays.
