= Birmingham pen trade =

- 1822 – 1960s
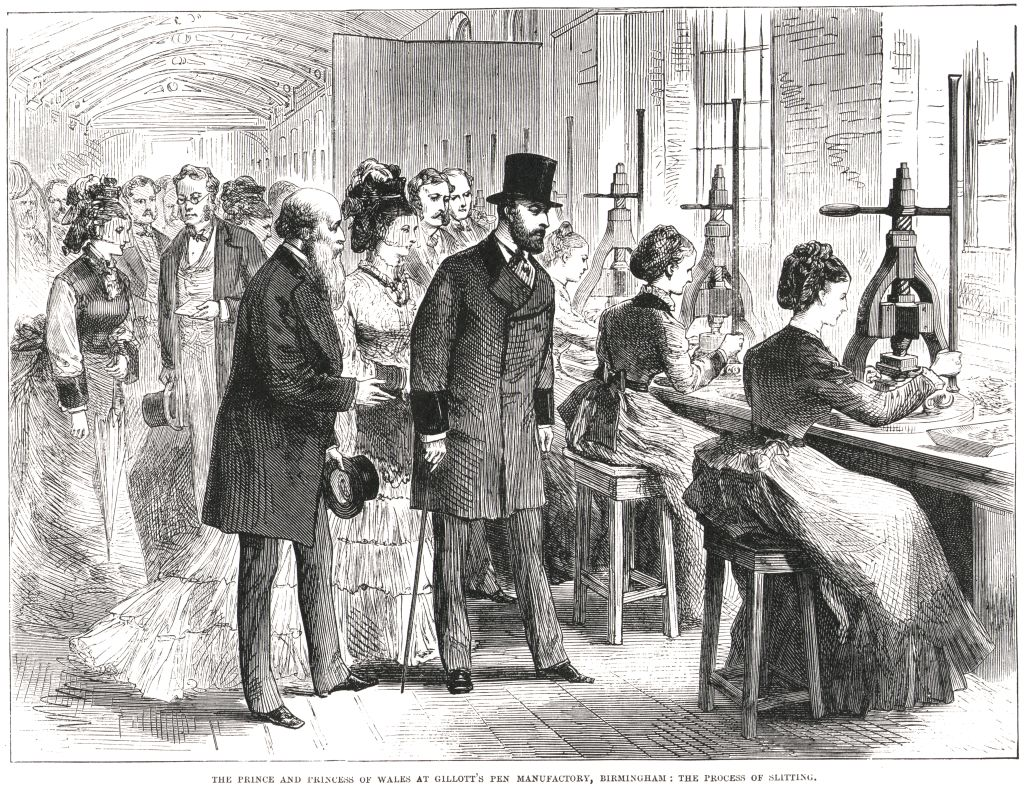
- Illustration depicting Albert Edward, Prince of Wales, and Princess Alexandra at Joseph Gillott's Victoria Works in 1874
- Duration: c. 140 years
- Location: Birmingham, U.K.
- Leaders: Joseph Gillott; Josiah Mason; John Mitchell; William Mitchell; James Perry

The Birmingham pen trade was a period in the 19th-century that positioned the city of Birmingham as the world's leading manufacturer of steel dip pen (or pen nibs). It started in the 1820s when a group of entrepreneurs introduced mass production methods to leave the craftsman’s workshop behind and become a true industry. Some of those pioneers were brothers John and William Mitchell, Josiah Mason, James Perry, and Joseph Gillott. Steel pens replaced quills, the usual writing instrument by then.

The trade was a significant part of the city's industrial heritage, as part of the Industrial Revolution that had evolved in Great Britain since around 1760, then spreading to continental Europe and the United States. During its heyday, there were more than 100 pen manufacturers in Birmingham.

The trade evolved in the Birmingham Jewellery Quarter and its surrounding area in the 19th century. "Pen" is the old term for what is now generally referred to as a nib, and for over a century the city was the world's leading manufacturer of steel nibs for dip pens, also making nibs in brass, bronze, and other alloys. At the height of the Jewellery Quarter's operations there were about 100 pen factories which employed around 8,000 skilled craftspeople.

The trade also pioneered craftsmanship, manufacturing processes and provided employment opportunities especially for women, who constituted more than 70% of the workforce. In its peak, there were about 100,000 varieties of pens (nibs) manufactured in Birmingham. By the end of the 19th century the number of manufacturers had declined to just twelve. Fountain pens did not immediately displace dip pens in general usage; it was the mass market success of the ballpoint pen in the post WW2 era that finally made traditional pen nibs obsolete for all but specialized applications.

== History ==
=== 19th century ===
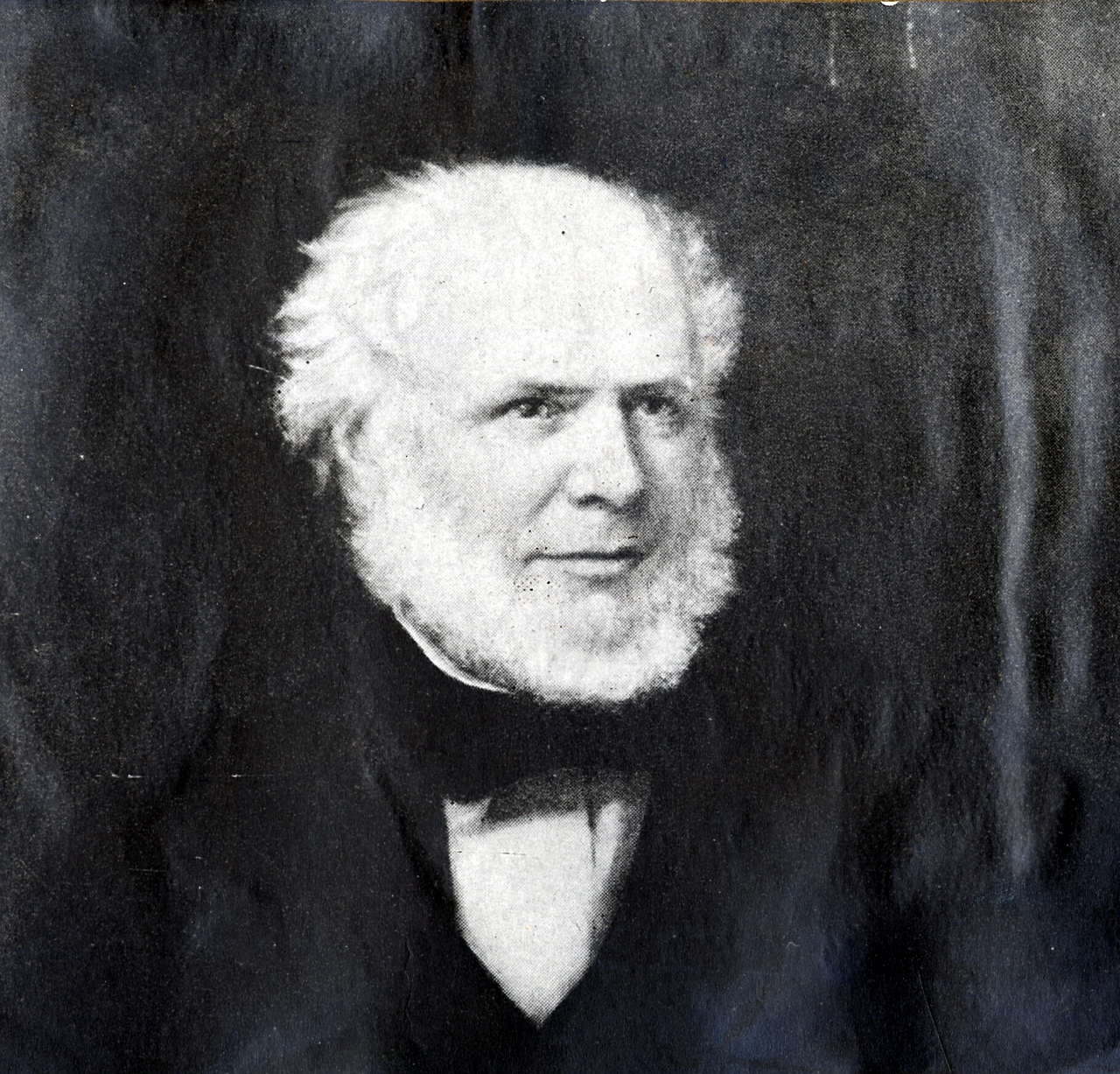
Joseph Gillott, one of the main pen manufacturers

John Mitchell manufactured pens in Newhall Street; he went on to pioneer the mass production of steel pens (prior to this, the quill was the most common form of writing instrument). The Mitchells are credited as being the first manufacturers to use machines to cut pen nibs, greatly speeding up the process. John's brother William later set up his own pen-making business in St Paul's square.

Baker and Finnemore operated in James Street, near St Paul's Square; C. Brandauer & Co Ltd. (founded as Ash & Petit) traded at 70 Navigation Street; Joseph Gillott & Sons Ltd. made pen nibs in Bread Street (now Cornwall Street) for companies such as Perry & Co.; Hinks, Wells & Co. traded in Buckingham Street; George W. Hughes traded in St Paul's Square; Leonardt & Catwinkle (then D. Leonardt & Co.) traded in George and Charlotte Streets, and M. Myers & Son. were based at 8 Newhall Street.

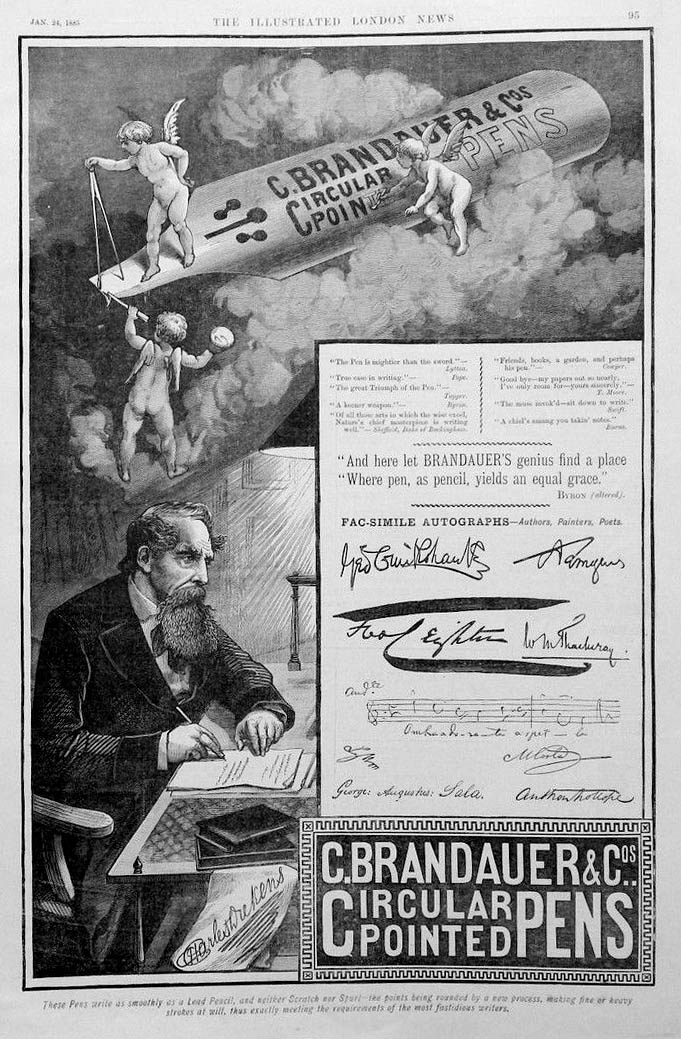
A.C. Brandauer & Co. advertisement of 1885

In 1828 Josiah Mason developed a cheap, efficient slip-in nib based on existing models, which could be added to a pen holder.

By the 1850s, Birmingham was the world center of steel nib manufacture; more than half the steel nibs manufactured in the world were made there. Thousands of skilled craftsmen and women were employed in the industry. Many new manufacturing techniques were perfected in Birmingham, enabling the city's factories to mass-produce their pens cheaply and efficiently. These were sold worldwide to many who previously could not afford to write, thus encouraging the development of education and literacy.

Women made 18,000 pens a day, under strict rules of no talking, no singing, and no wasting of the metal among others. Men served as the toolmakers and looked after the furnaces but the majority of the workers in the factories were women. In the latter half of the 19th-century young children were also employed, with ages varying between 10 and 12 years old.

=== 20th century ===
Another manufacturer was Richard Esterbrook, who made quills in Cornwall, his home town. He started by working in the stationery trade of Birmingham, where he learnt about the mechanical process invented by Mitchell for making steel pen nibs. In searching for opportunities, Esterbrook realized there were no steel pen manufacturers in the United States. He approached five craftsmen who worked for John Mitchell in Navigation Street with an idea of setting up a business in Camden, New Jersey. Esterbrook later went on to become one of the largest steel-pen manufacturers in the world. He returned to Birmingham for help when in 1928 the British Government placed restrictions on US imports. John Mitchell's factory was used to produce Esterbrook pens within the UK, through an agreement with Esterbrook representatives. In both the USA and Britain Esterbrook also offered fountain pens from an early date, with larger scale production from the 1930s on.

During World War II, pen manufacture in the city was somewhat disturbed. Mitchell's factory on Moland Street was struck by an incendiary bomb; the premises were partially rebuilt during the war with government aid, on condition that a government stationery office and ammunition assay office could reside there. The John Mitchell business and factory were sold to Esterbrook in 1947. Twenty years later, the Esterbrook Pen Co. was taken over by the "Venus Pencil Co", which had a modern factory in King's Lynn, Norfolk, to which Esterbrook's production was transferred until 1972.

=== Decline ===
The advent and mass production and worldwide spread of the ballpoint pen patented by László Bíró in 1943, contributed to a decline of use of the traditional dip and fountain pen nibs. The cost of production and market saturation should be also considered as causes as well. By the 1960s, the Birmingham pen industry was gone.

== Manufacturers ==
Some of the main pen makers of Birmingham were: Baker & Finnemore, C. Brandauer & Co., Hinks Wells & Co., Joseph Gillott's, Geo W. Hughes, D. Leonardt & Co., Macniven & Cameron, Josiah Mason, John Mitchell, William Mitchell, M. Myers & Son, Perry & Co., A. Sommerville & Co.

== See also ==
- Dip pen
- Victoria Works, Birmingham
- Pen Museum
- Calligraphy
