= Gillott's =

English manufacturing company

Joseph Gillott

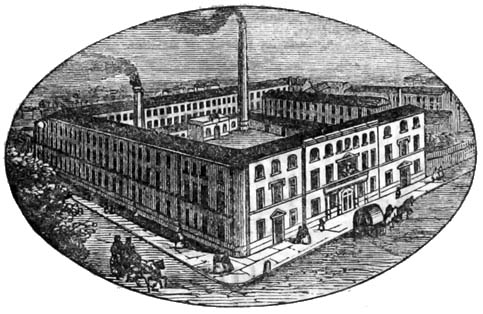
- Victoria Works, Gillott's factory in Birmingham
- Type: Private (1827–1969); Brand (1969–present)
- Industry: Metallurgy; Stationery
- Founded: 1827 in Birmingham, United Kingdom
- Founder: Joseph Gillott
- Defunct: 1969; 57 years ago
- Fate: Acquired by British Pens in 1969, merged to other brands
- Headquarters: Victoria Works, Birmingham, U.K.
- Area served: Worldwide
- Products: Dip pens
- Parent: British Pens Ltd.
- Website: williammitchell.co.uk/gillott

Joseph Gillott's was a British manufacturing company based in Birmingham and founded by Joseph Gillott in 1827 that produced high-quality dip pens. In 1969, Joseph Gillott's was taken over by British Pens Ltd., becoming a brand of it.

Pen lines with the Gillott's name were manufactured in the British Pens factory of West Midlands, and currently commercialised by William Mitchell Ltd, (the new name adopted by British Pens in 1982).

== History ==
=== Beginning and development ===
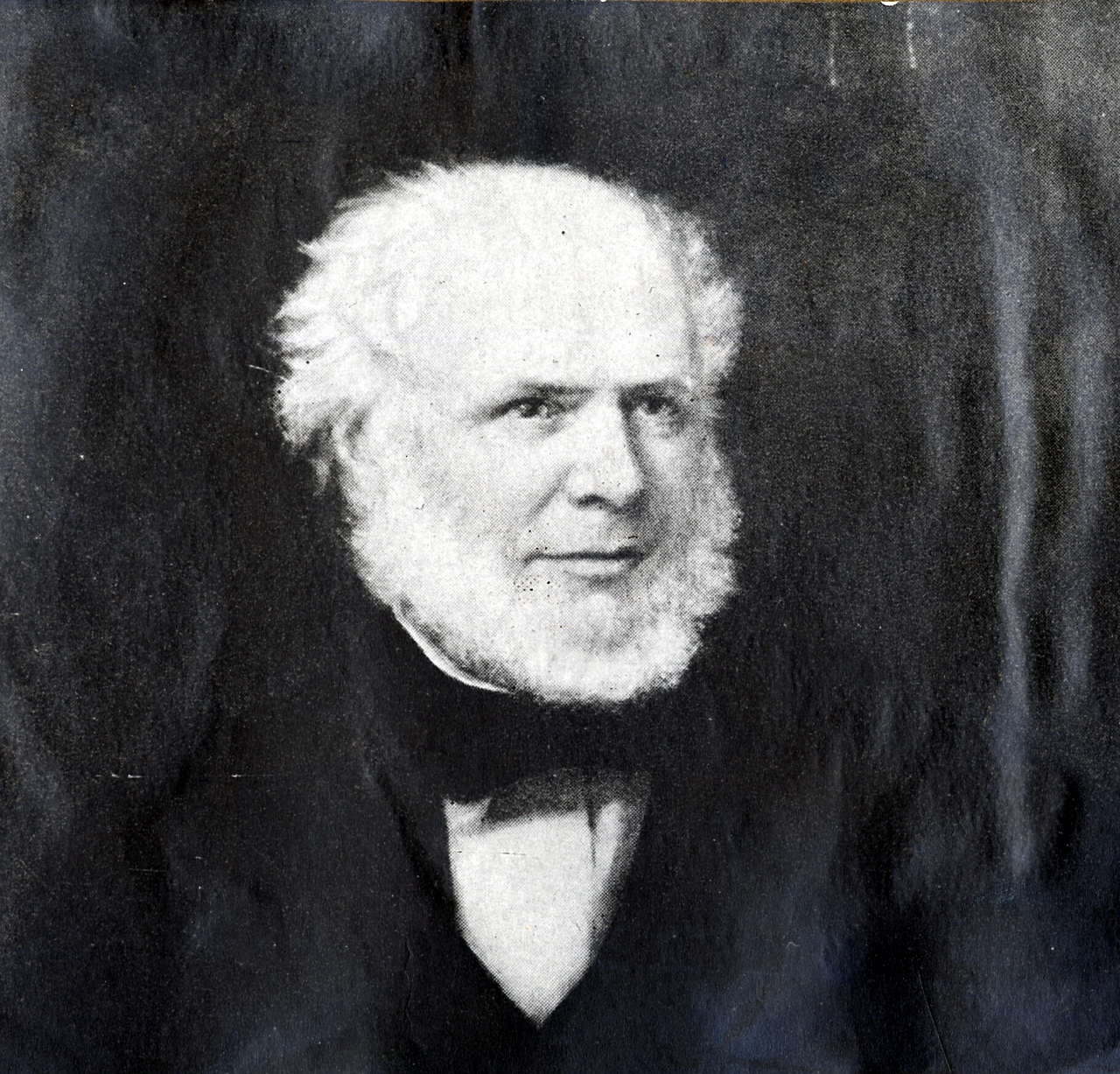
Joseph Gillott, founder

Joseph Gillott was a working cutler in his home town Sheffield, but in 1821 he moved to Birmingham, where he found employment in the steel toy trade, the technical name for the manufacture of steel buckles, chains and light ornamental steel-work generally.

About 1830 he turned his attention to the manufacture of steel pens by machinery, and in 1831 patented a process for placing elongated points on the nibs of pens. Subsequently, Gillott adapted the stamping press to the requirements of the manufacture, as cutting out the blanks, forming the slits, bending the metal, and impressing the maker's name on the pens.

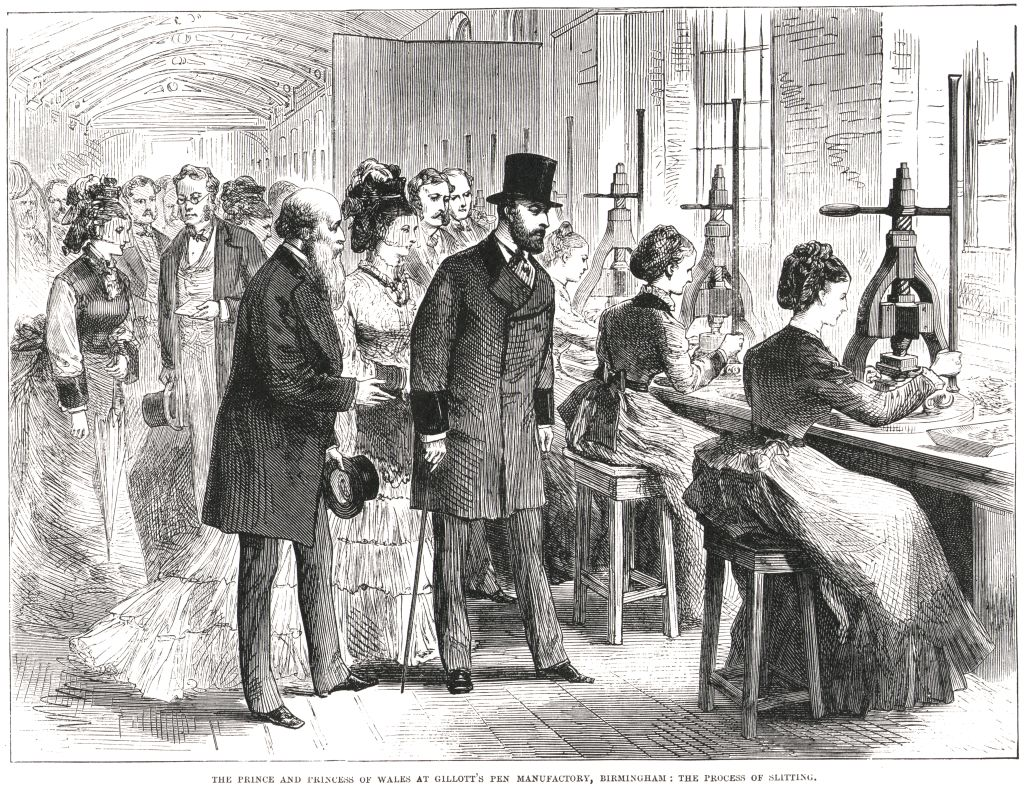
Albert Edward, Prince of Wales, and Princess Alexandra at Gillott's Victoria Works, 1874

He also devised improved modes of preparing the metal for the action of the press, tempering, cleansing, and polishing, and, in short, many little details of manufacture necessary to give them the required flexibility to enable them to compete with the quill pen.

One great difficulty to be overcome was their extreme hardness and stiffness; this was effected by making slits at the side in addition to the central one, which had previously been solely used. A further improvement, that of cross grinding the points, was subsequently adopted. The first gross of pens with three slits was sold for seven pounds. In 1830 the price was $2.00; in 1832, $1.50; in 1861, 12 cents, and a common variety for 4 cents a gross.

The simplicity, accuracy, and readiness of the machinery employed enabled Gillott to produce steel pens in large quantities, and as he sold them at high prices he rapidly made a fortune. He ultimately employed 450 persons, who produced upwards of five tons per week, and the price was reduced from one shilling each to 4 pence a gross. His son, also Joseph, continued the family business of manufacturing steel pen nibs and continued to live in the Birmingham area, close to the large factory on Graham Street in the Jewellery Quarter, known as the Victoria Works.

=== British Pens and present days ===
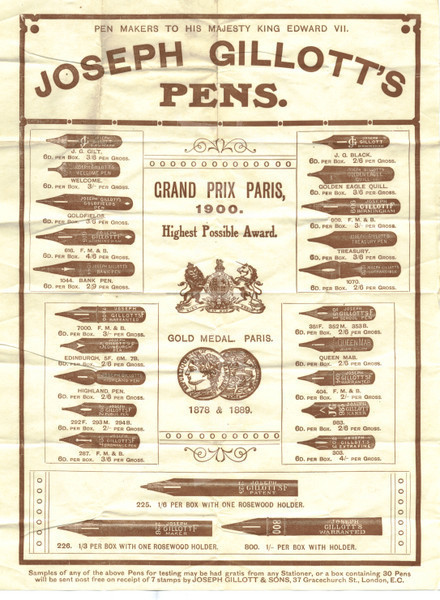
Advertisement, c. 1900

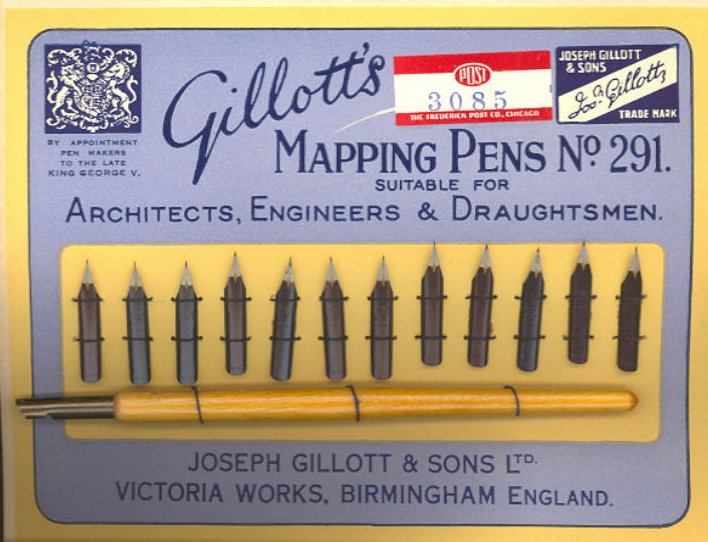
Gillot's 291 pens with their holder

Nevertheless, the decreasing production of dip pens and the subsequent demise of the industry in Birmingham is often blamed on the invention of the ballpoint pen in 1938 by the Hungarian Laszlo Biro.

In 1920, when Hinks Wells & Co and William Mitchell came together at the Pedigree Works in Birmingham, founded a new company called "British Pens", which added Cumberland Pencils in 1921. After World War II staff from the London Jewel Company joined them and they began to produce ballpoint pens.

In 1961 British Pens acquired the pen businesses of Perry & Co. and other manufacturers like John Mitchell and Joseph Gillott's. As part of the Twinlock Group its name was changed to "Cumberland Graphics" in 1975. Byron Head, the managing director of William Mitchell, acquired British Pens in 1982, renaming it "William Mitchell Ltd.". The company still makes pens in the West Midlands.

== Products ==
Gillott manufactured fine-point dip pens, suitable for drawing, mapping and calligraphy purposes. Some of the nibs models were #170, 290, 291, 303, 404, 659, 850, 1068, 1290, 1950 and 2788. Some of them are still commercialised.

=== Gallery ===
(Put the mouse on the image to see the model number):

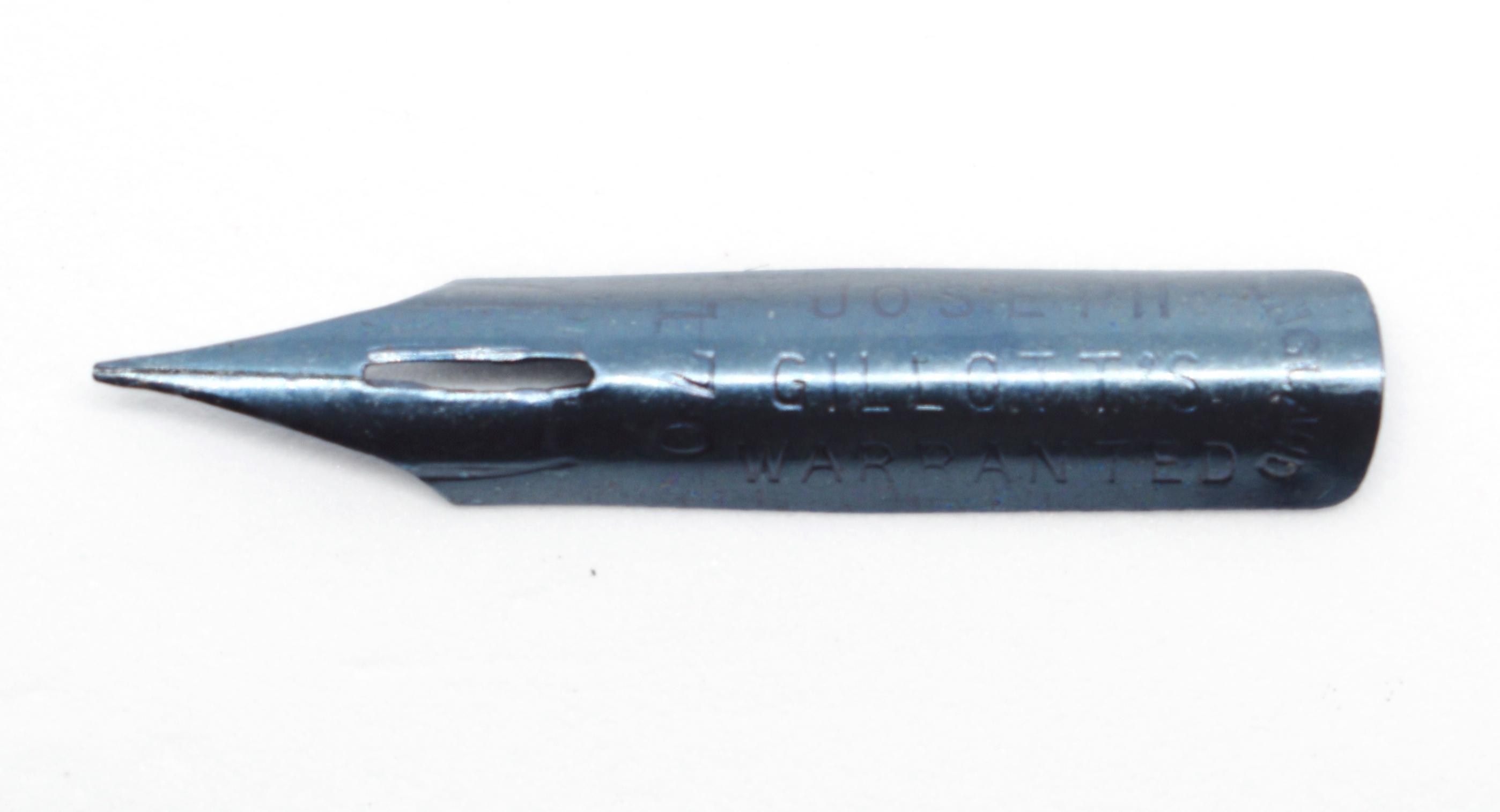
170

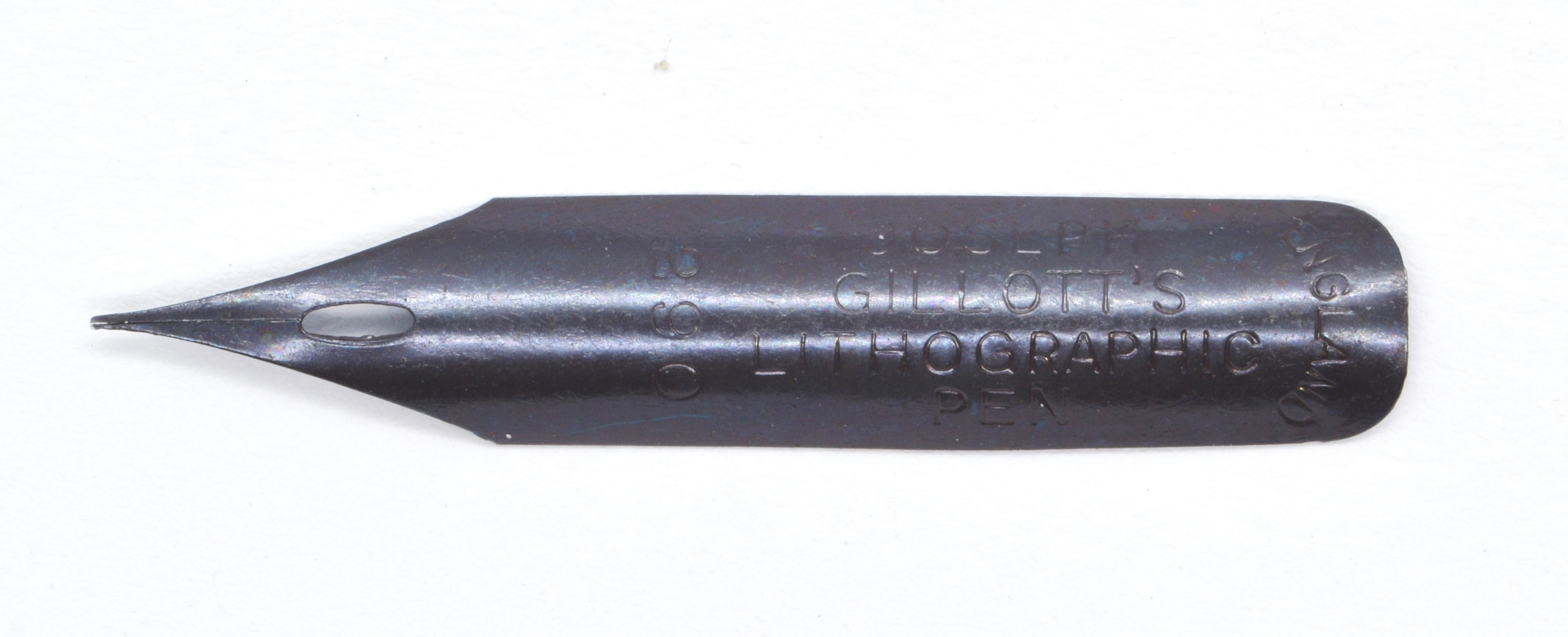
290

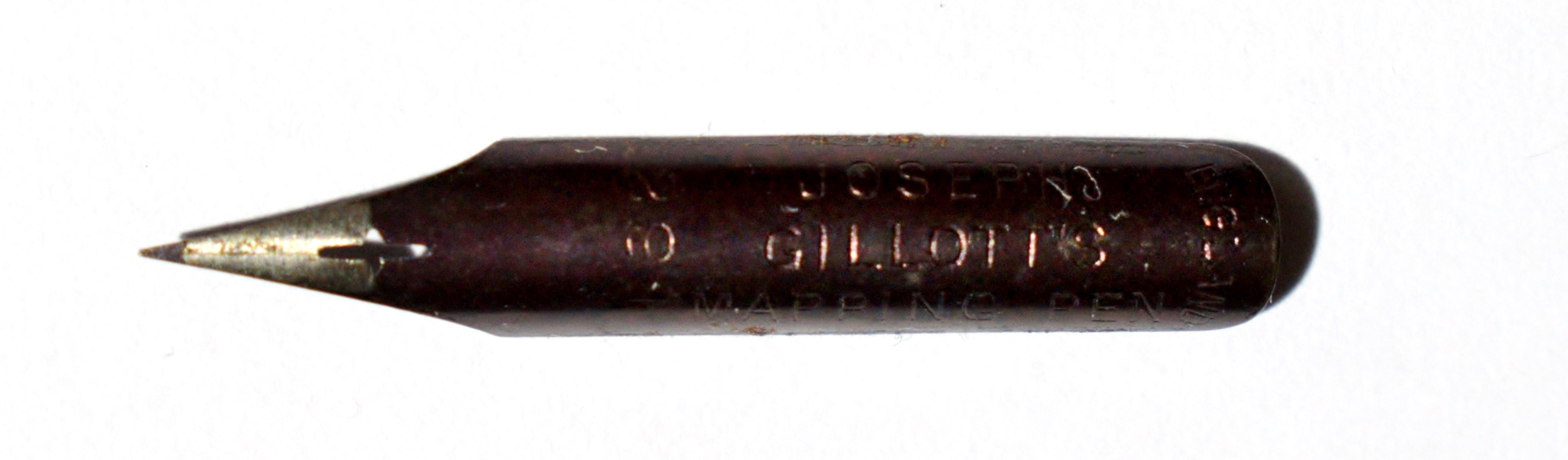
291

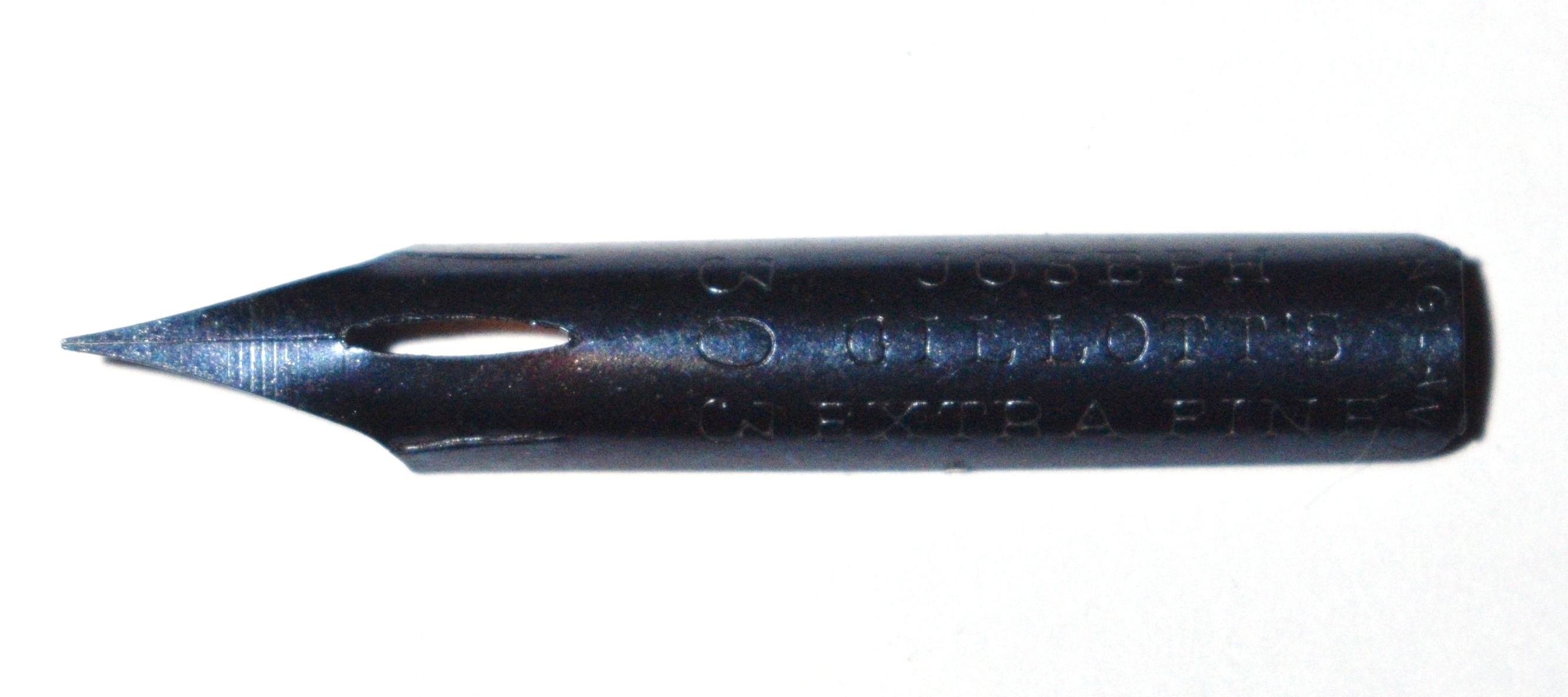
303

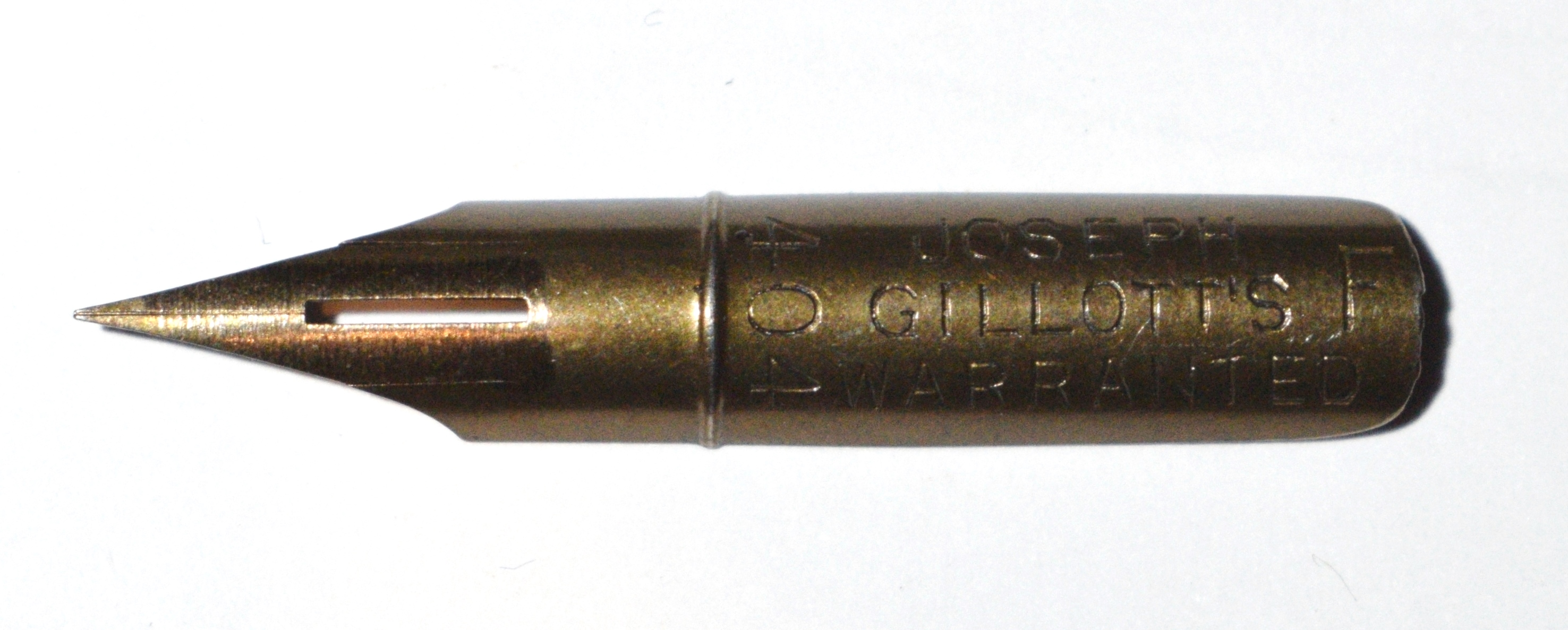
404

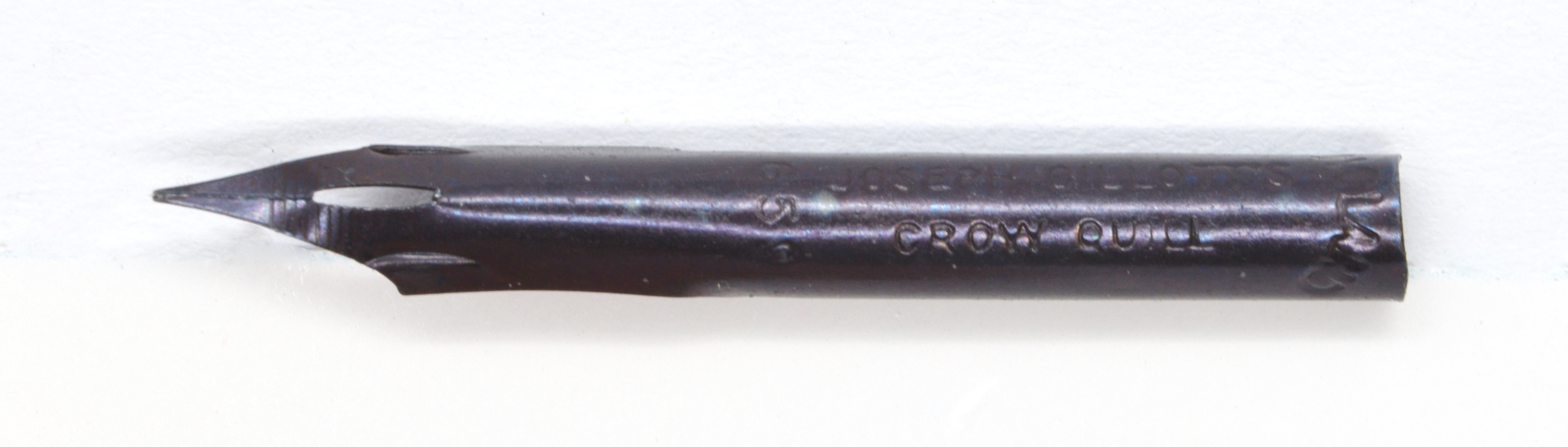
659

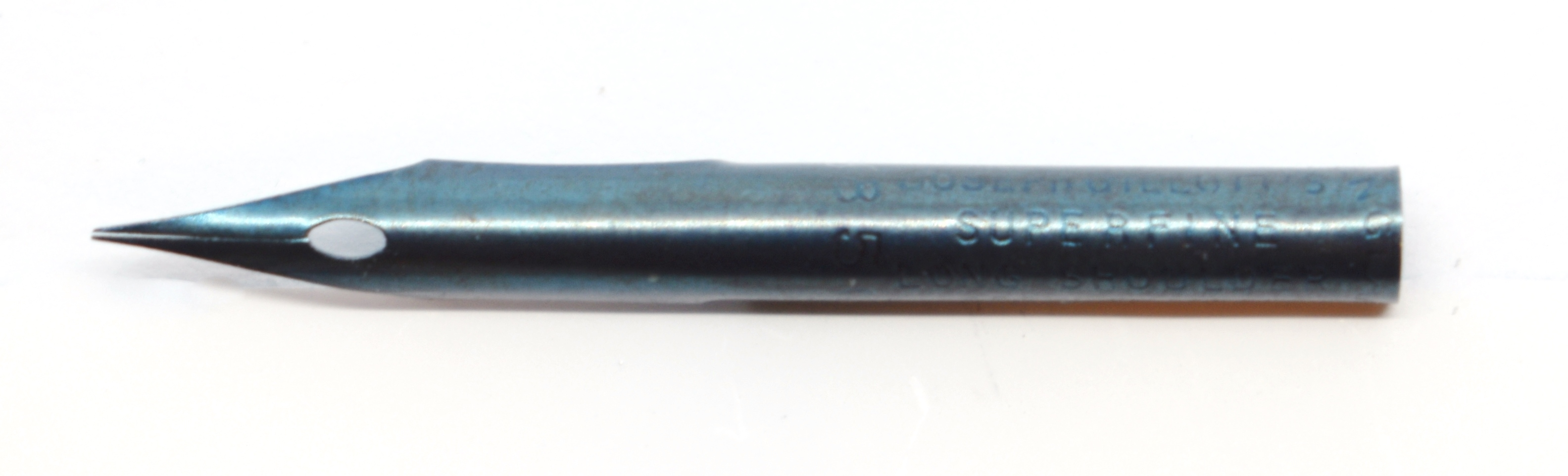
850

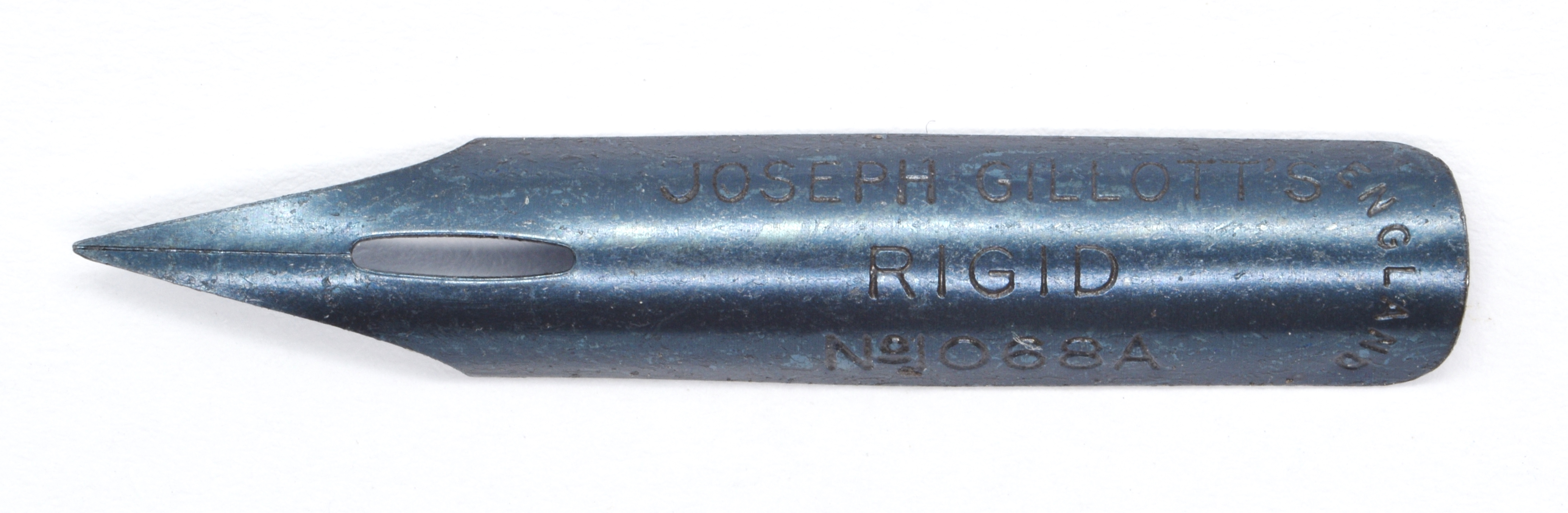
1068

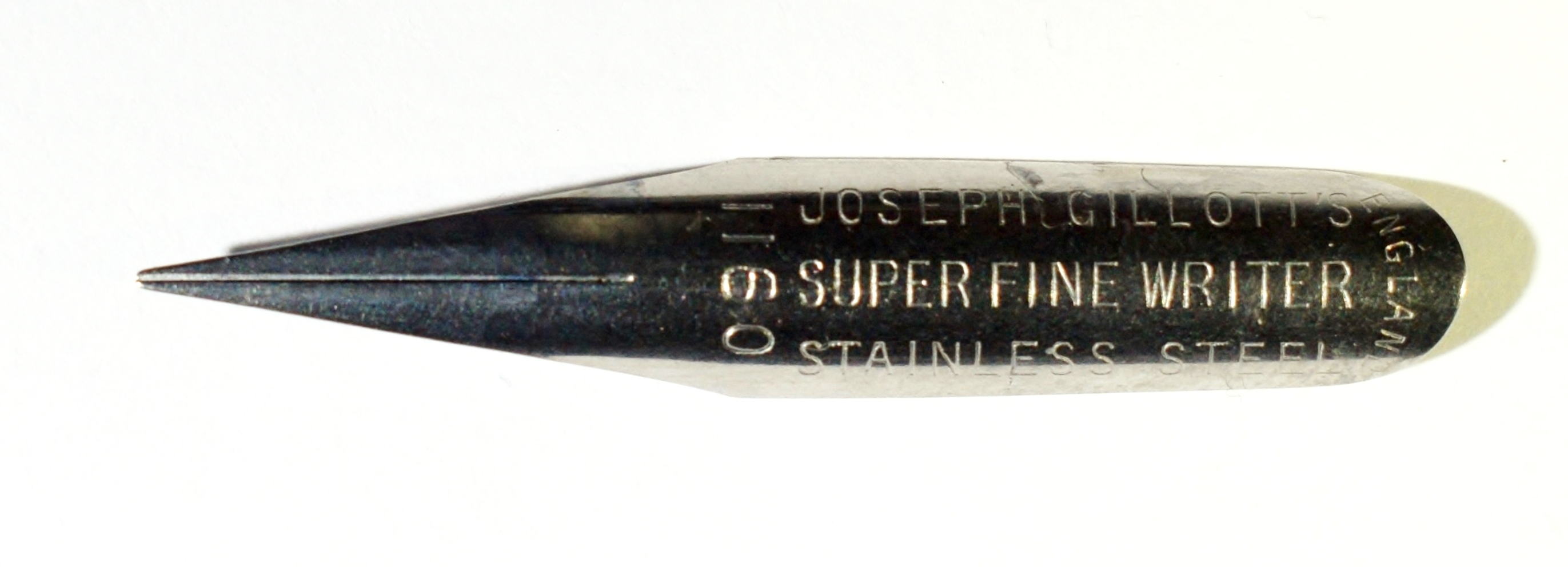
1160

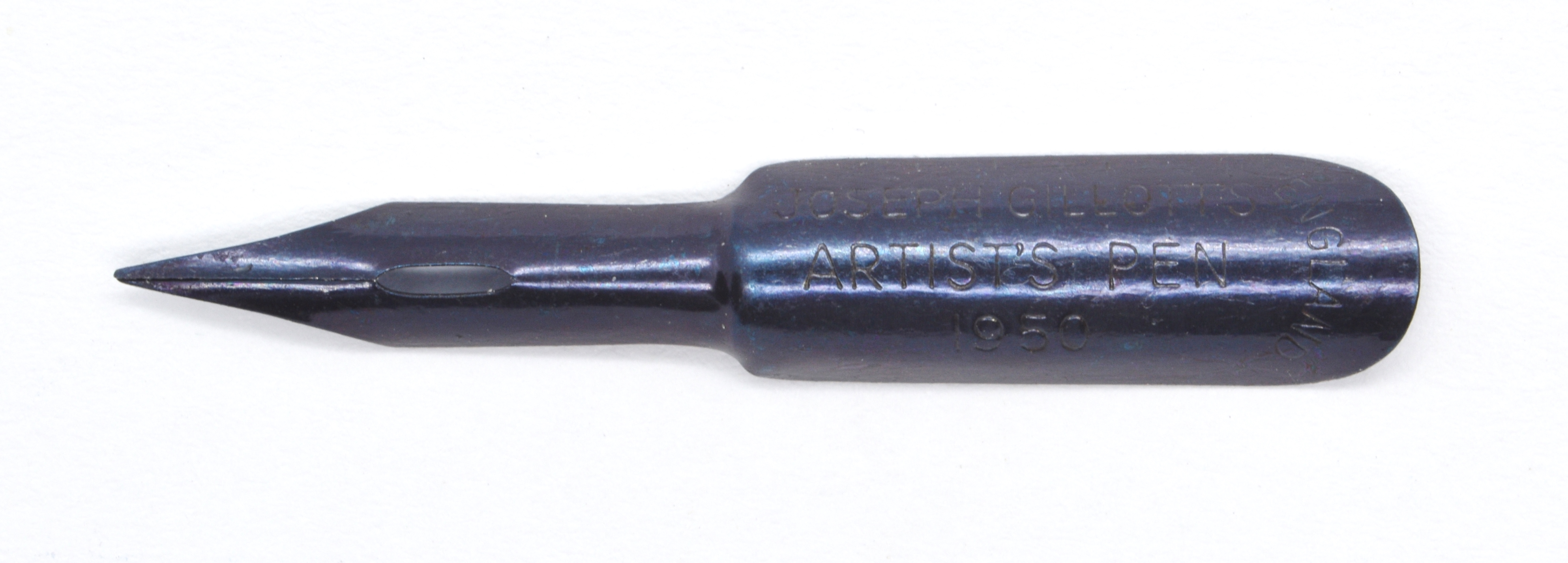
1950

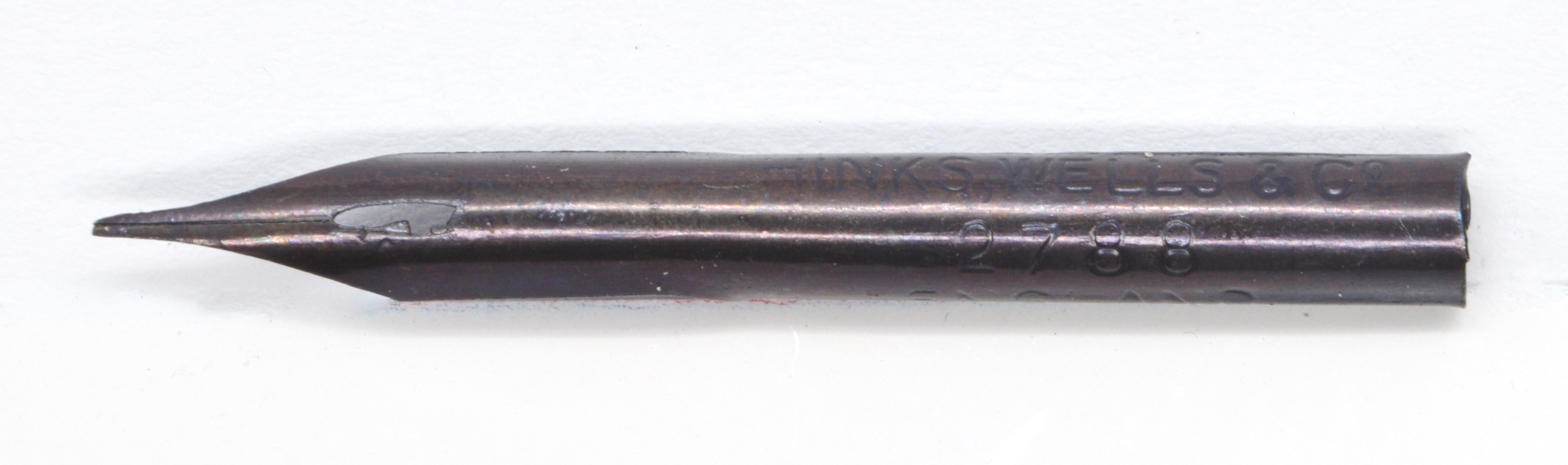
2788

== See also ==
- Victoria Works, Birmingham
- Birmingham pen trade

== Bibliography ==
- A Tour Around Gillotts Pen Factory, from The Shops and Companies of London and the Trades and Manufactories of Great Britain, edited by Henry Mayhew, The Grand Printing and Publishing Company, London, 1865. With illustrations published in The Graphic, 1874
