= Orphanage Road =

Road in Sutton Coldfield, England

Coordinates: 52.530°N 1.827°W

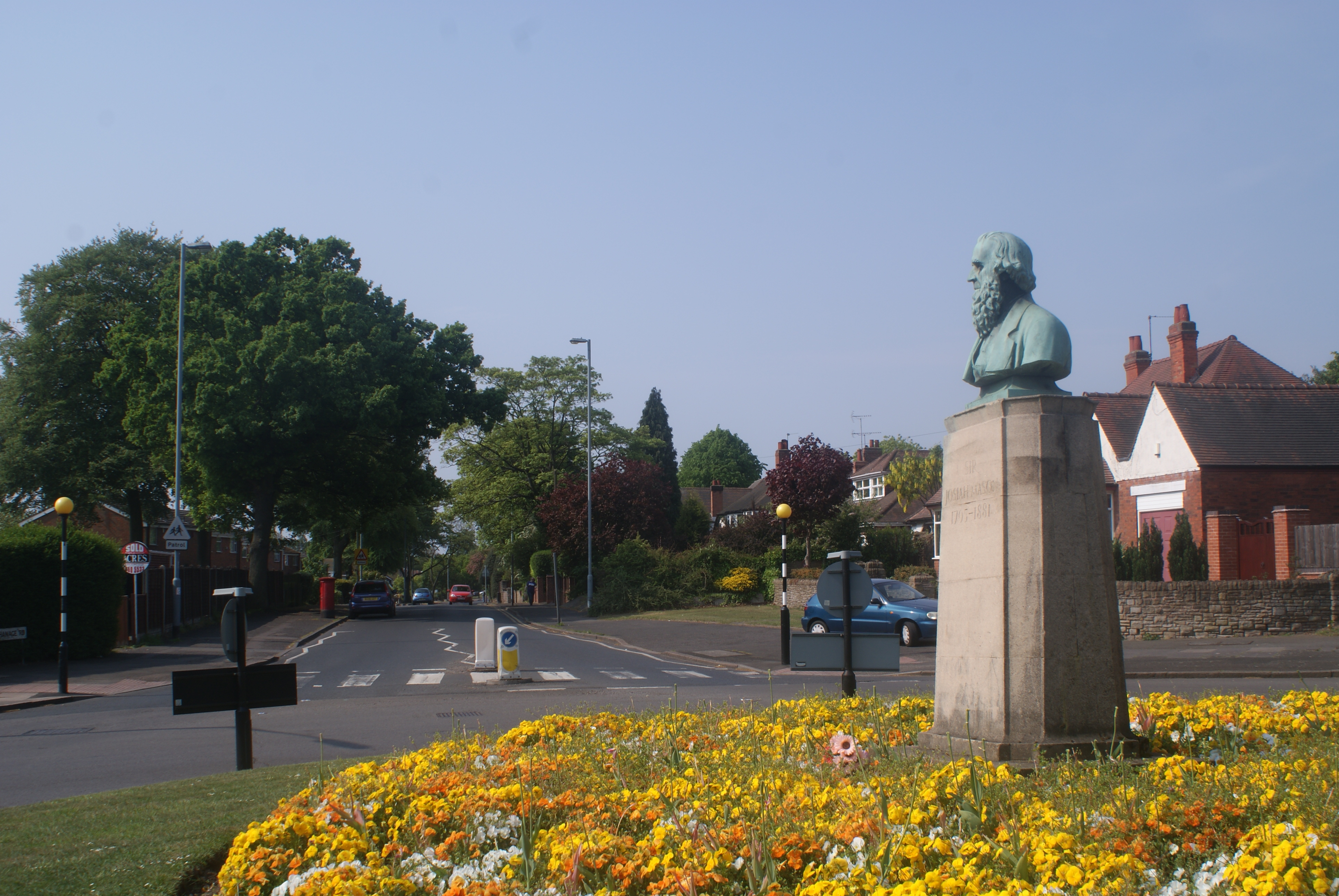
Looking down Orphanage Road from the roundabout on Chester Road, showing the bust of Sir Josiah Mason.

Orphanage Road is a road in Erdington and Wylde Green, Sutton Coldfield, West Midlands, England. Orphanage Road runs from Erdington Library, just before Erdington High Street, to Penns Lane, Sutton Coldfield and leads to Berwood Farm Rd and Welwyndale Rd. It covers the postcodes of B24 and B72.

It was originally named Bell Lane and was renamed after the orphanage which Josiah Mason built there in 1860 to a design by J.R. Botham. Mason also built almshouses adjacent to the orphanage in 1858. The orphanage included a 250-foot tower, famously scaled by Sir Benjamin Stone to take photographs of the panoramic views over Erdington. The orphanage was formally opened by Mason in 1869 and extended in 1876. The orphanage building was demolished in 1964, in the mid-20th century, when Victorian architecture was generally not highly valued and anti-Victorianism was influential. The trustees thought the orphanage was "outdated and expensive to maintain." The tower was demolished by replacing the stones at the base with wooden posts which were then ignited. The site was sold for housing.
