= Perry & Co. =

Perry & Co., Ltd.
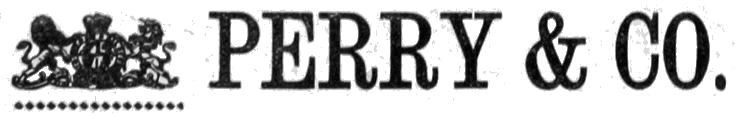
- 1898 logo

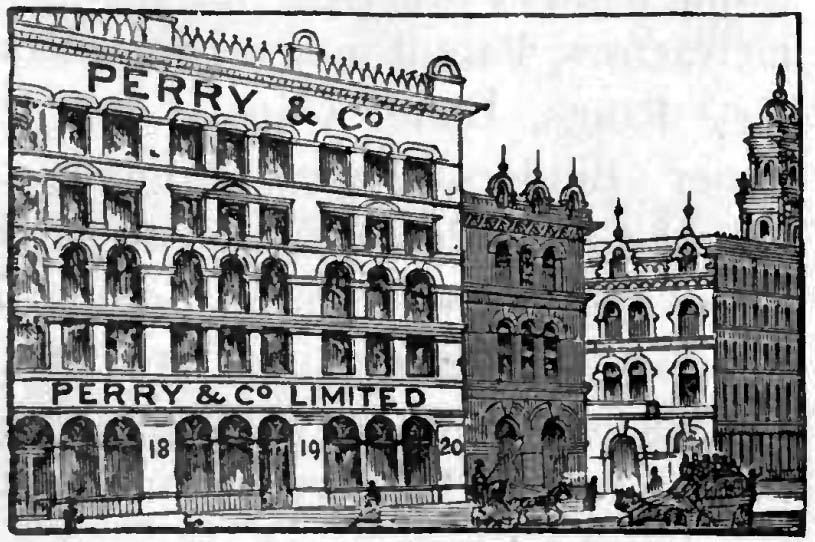
- The Perry & Co. building in London, 1890
- Industry: Metalworking
- Founded: Manchester, 1824
- Founder: James Perry
- Defunct: 1961; 65 years ago
- Fate: Acquired by British Pens, Ltd.
- Headquarters: London, United Kingdom
- Area served: Worldwide
- Products: Dip pens, Bicycle chains

Perry & Co., Ltd was a British manufacturing company heartquartered in London. The company was the largest in its country of origin, producing a huge range of dip pen models. Perry & Co. also manufactured bicycle chains and accessories.

== History ==
=== The beginning ===
James Perry, still a schoolmaster and being dissatisfied with the quality of existing pens, began making steel pens by hand. The firm was founded in Manchester as James Perry and Co. in 1824, but later moved to London, where they made and sold pens and pen-holders, pencils, elastic bands and ink, and dealt in stationers' supplies. From 1829 all of Perry's pens were made by Josiah Mason, which was considered by the time as the finest pens manufacturer. The excellence of their products swiftly raised them to the forefront of the new industry, exporting pens all over the world. By 1876 when the firm became a Limited Company, they equalled Esterbrook as being the largest manufacturers of pen nibs in the world.

=== Perry & Co. established ===
Sometime after 1847 James Perry and Co. became "Perry and Co." as the name was used in an 1866 advert. In 1876 Josiah Mason's steel-pen firm came together with Wiley & Son, pen and pencil case makers, and James Perry & Co under the title of "Perry & Co Ltd", acquiring its Birmingham base at Lancaster Street Works. The firm also began the production of steel chains and accessories for bicycles.

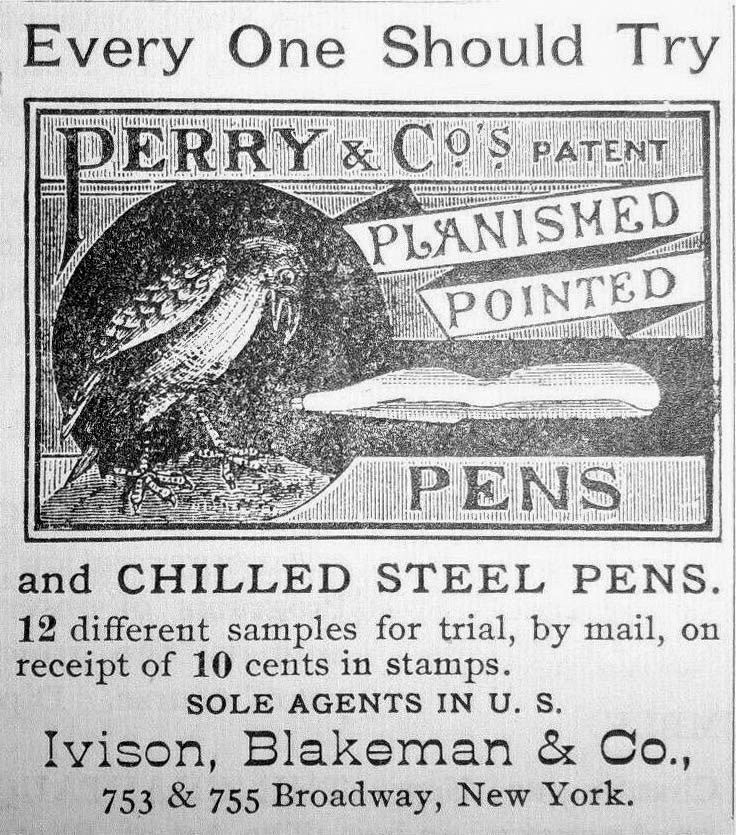
"Planishing pointed pens" ad, 1888

The same year the public company was registered on 28 January, to take over the businesses of Josiah Mason and A. Sommerville and Co, manufacturers of pens of Birmingham.

By the late 1890s the company was having financial problems and were bought by James William Bayliss, part owner of the Bayliss-Thomas car making company.

By 1914 Perry & Co specialized in steel pens and pen holders, cycle chains, free wheels, hubs, bells and cycle accessories, stationers' sundries, gold pens, solitaires, studs, sleeve links, tobacconists' and drapers' sundries and had 2,000 employees.

In 1945 the company transferred its chain making and cycle coaster hub business to a subsidiary, Perry Chain Co Ltd. The pen business was continued by Perry and Co (Pens division) Ltd, while Perry and Co (Holdings) Ltd became the main parent company, with financial control of the whole Perry group.

=== British Pens ===
In 1920, when Hinks Wells & Co and William Mitchell came together at the Pedigree Works in Birmingham, founded a new company called "British Pens", which added Cumberland Pencils in 1921. After World War II staff from the London Jewel Company joined them and they began to produce ballpoint pens.

In 1961 British Pens acquired the pen businesses of Perry & Co and other manufacturers like John Mitchell and Joseph Gillott's. As part of the Twinlock Group its name was changed to "Cumberland Graphics" in 1975. Byron Head, the Managing Director of William Mitchell (sinkers) and British Pens bought the two companies from Twinlock in 1982. The company still makes pens in the West Midlands.

== Models ==
Perry & Co. produced a large variety of models for different purposes, most of them designed to produce fine lines (such as Nº 25 or 341, which is still easy to find in stores of Argentina). Other models were also popular by their names, like the "Queen Mary" or the "Quill Pen" (Nº 230-231-232) Perry & Co. also produced different giant-sized versions of its N°2301 Indent Pen model. Those were 5" long (see thumbnail photo).

== Products ==
=== Gallery ===
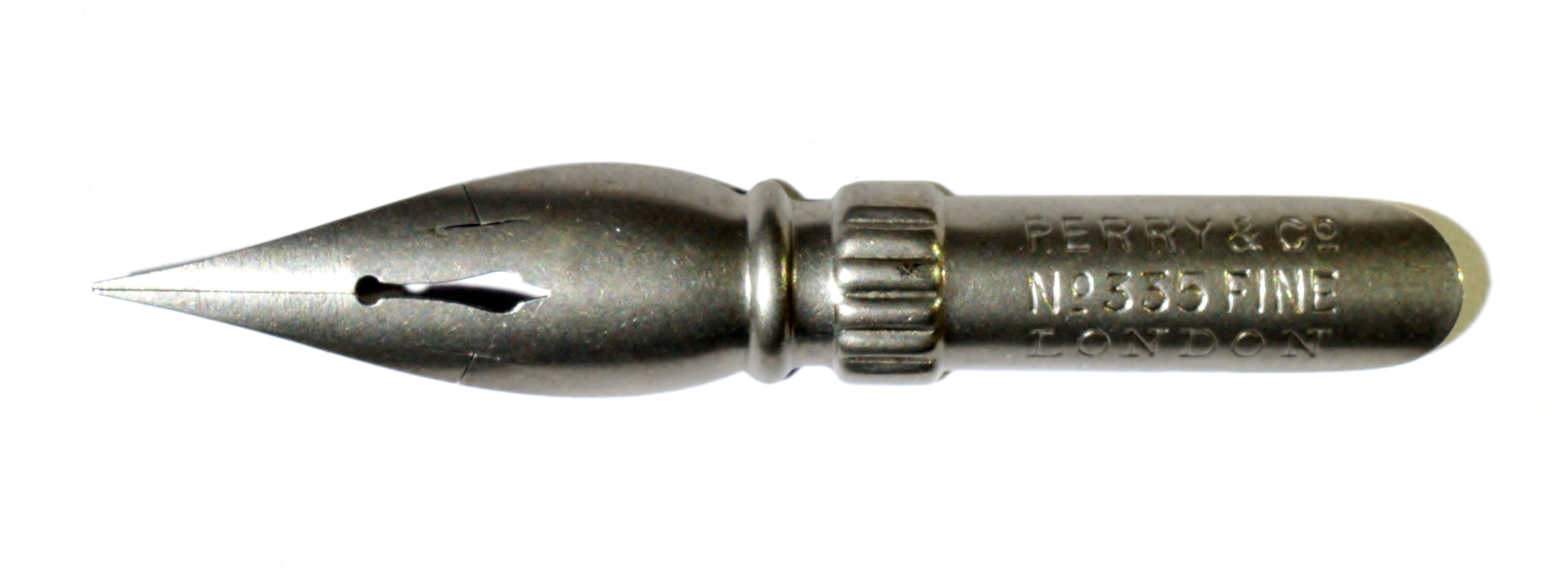
nº 335

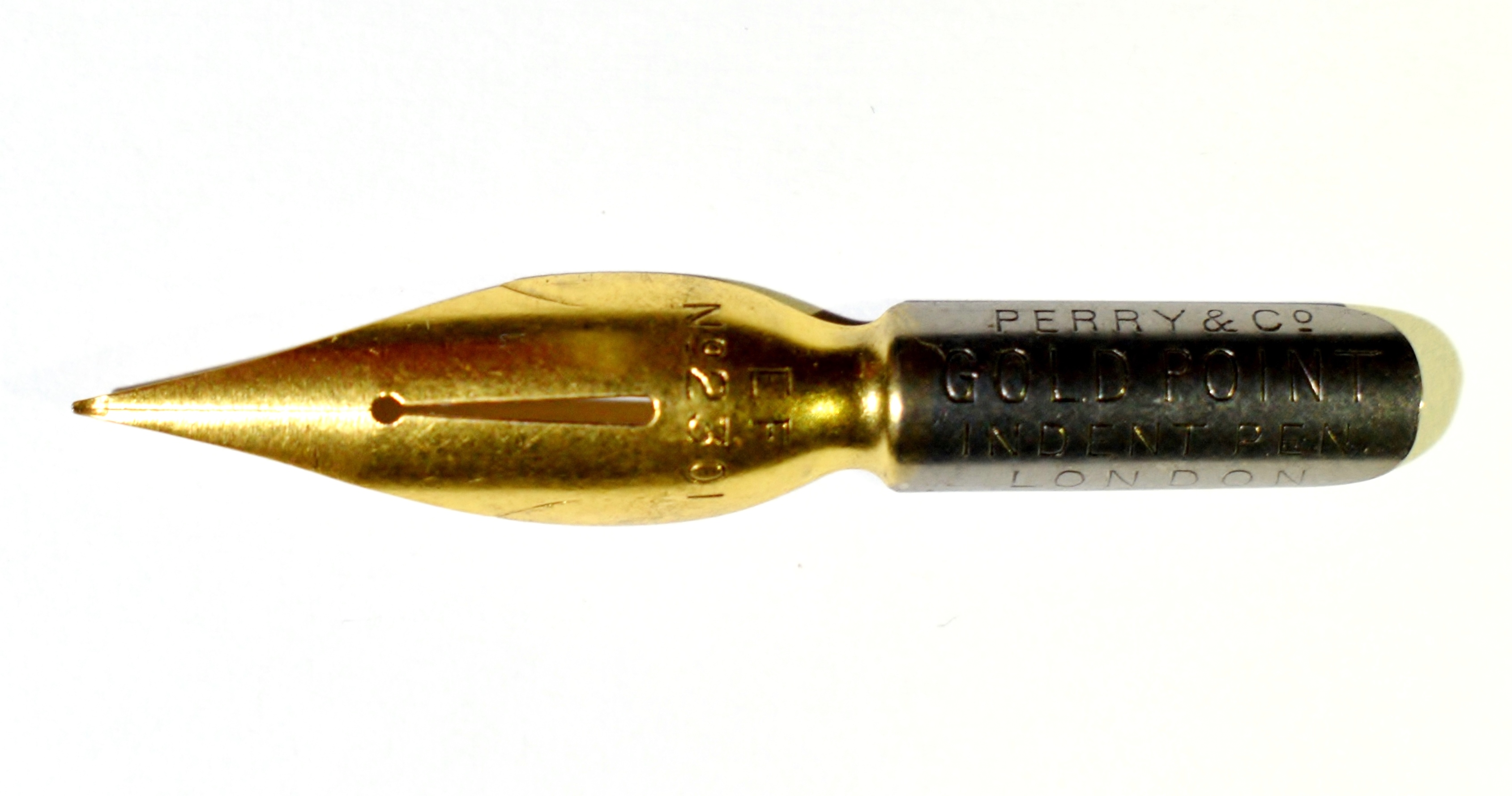
nº 2301

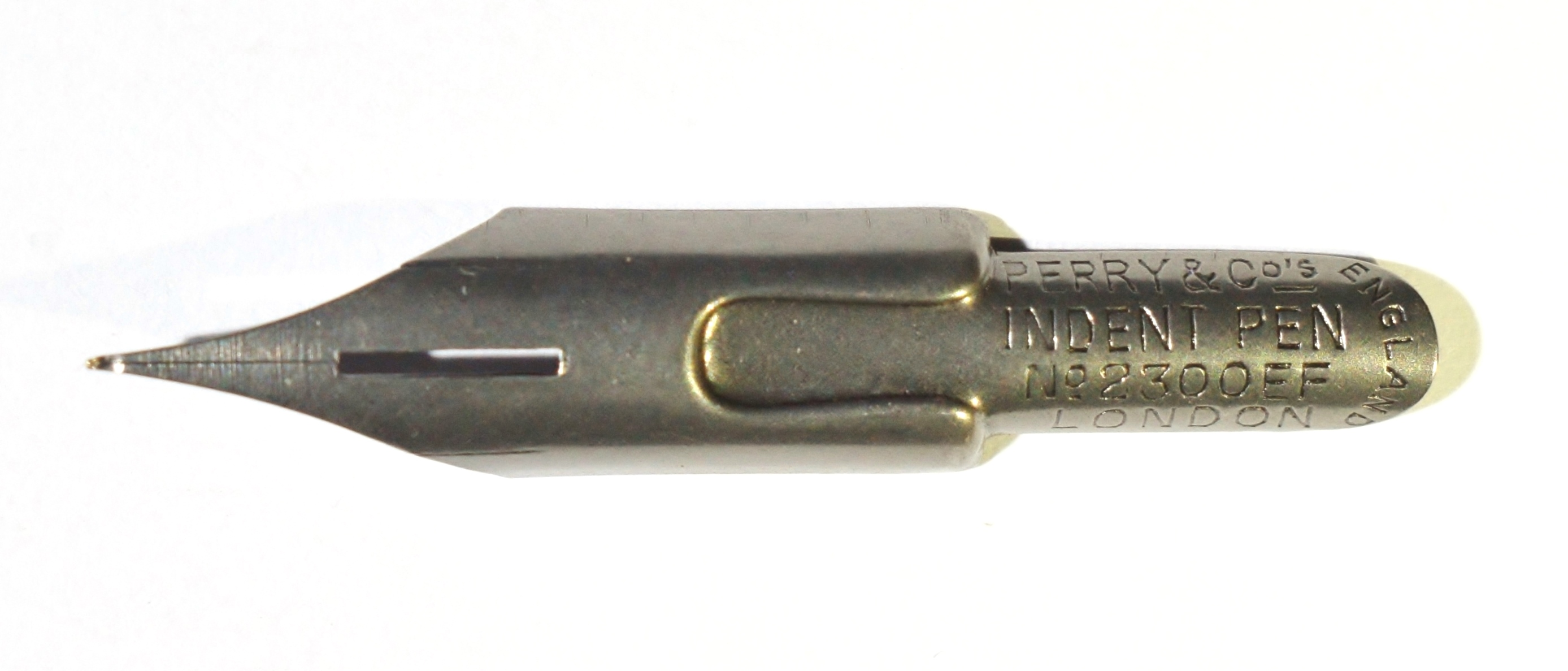
nº 2300 Falcon pen

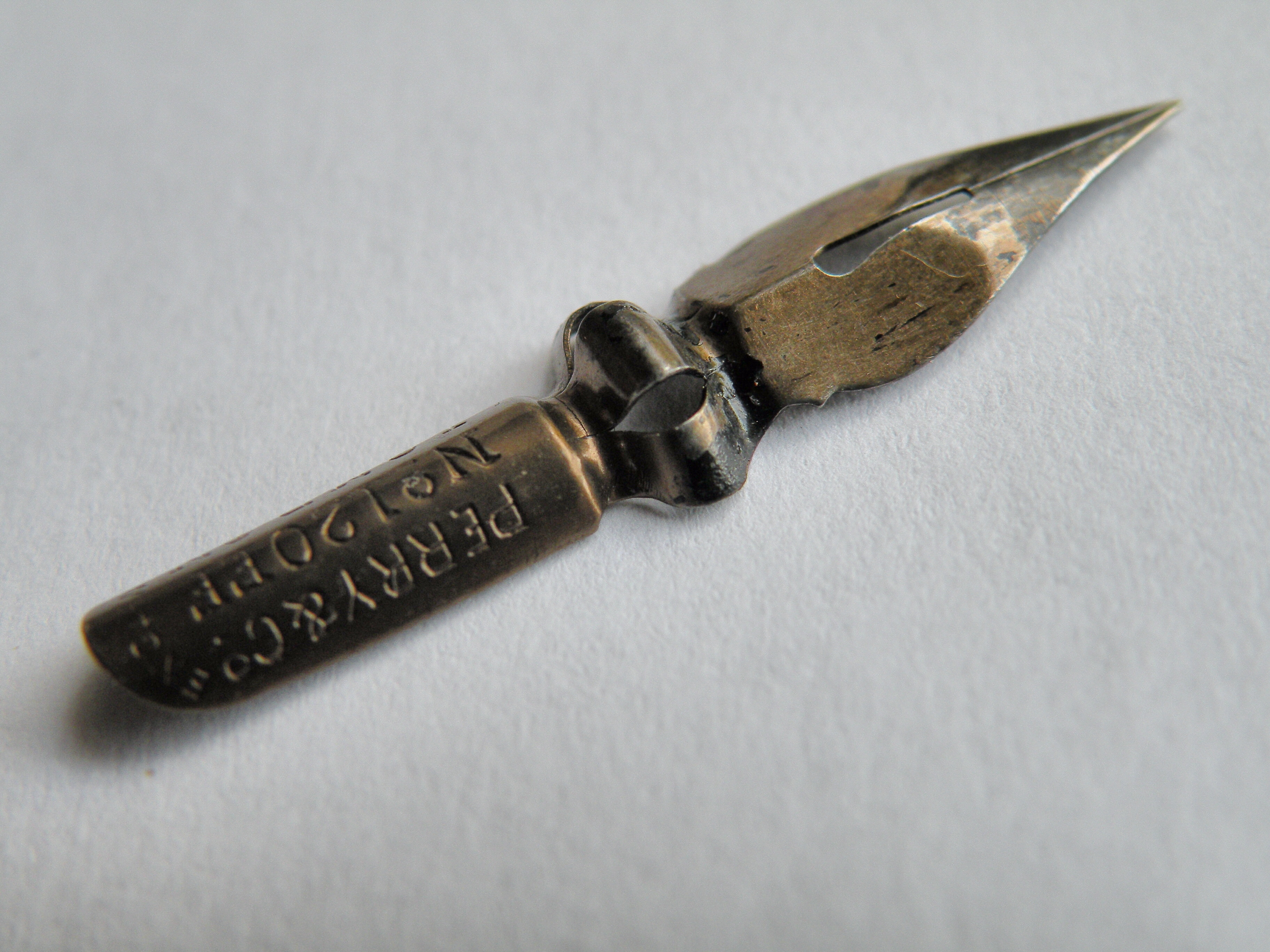
nº 120 Crown pen

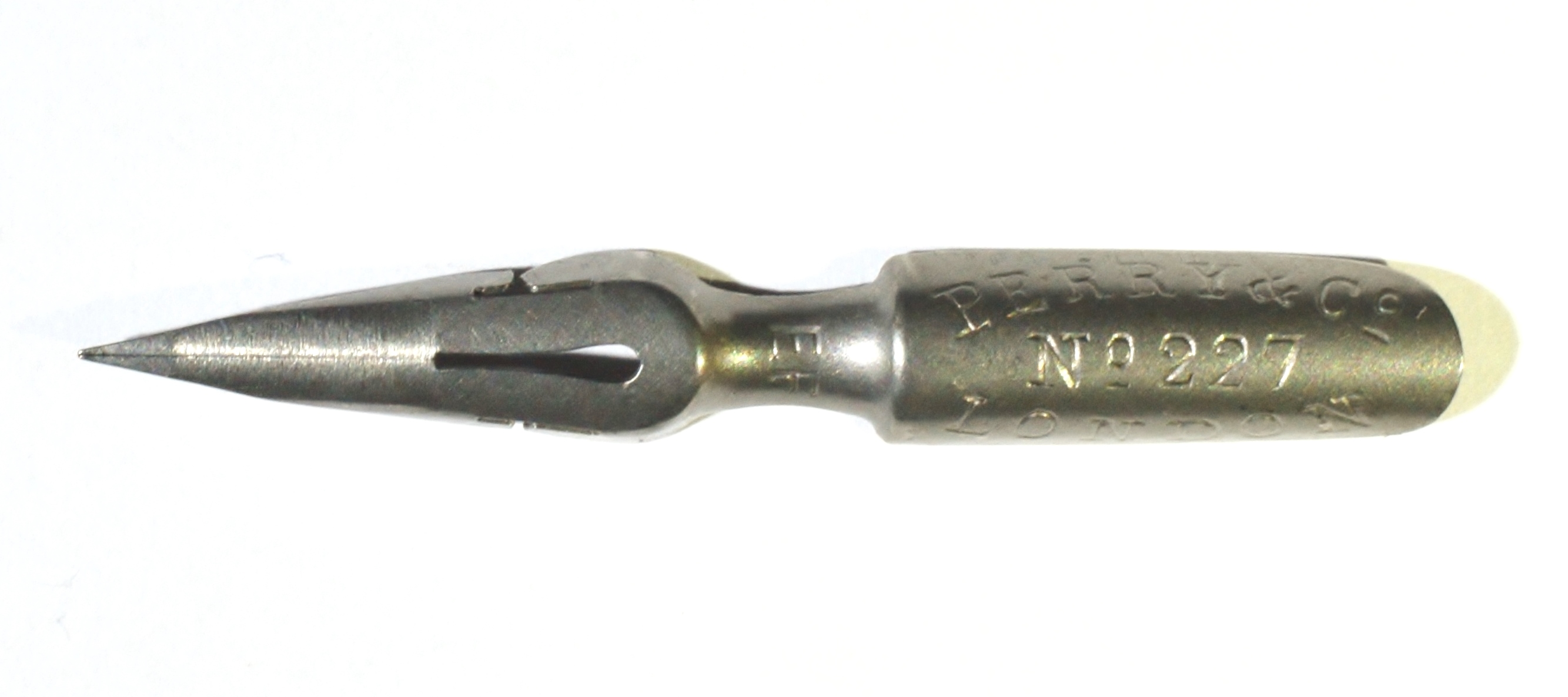
nº 227

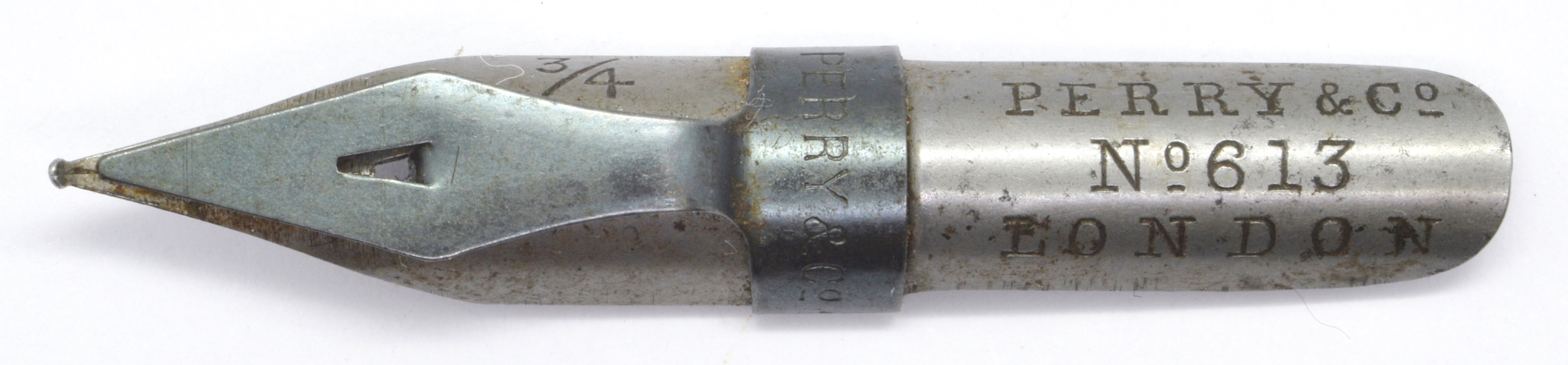
nº 613

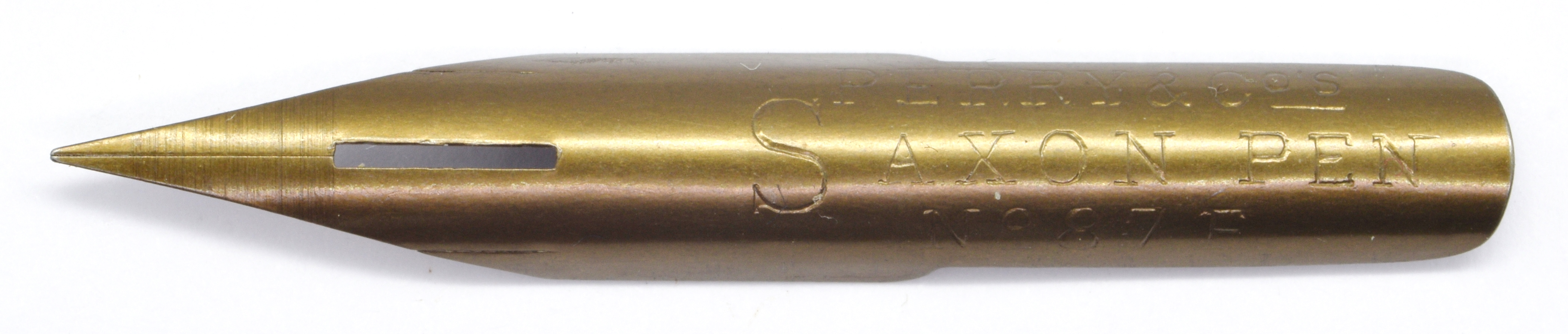
nº 87 Saxon pen

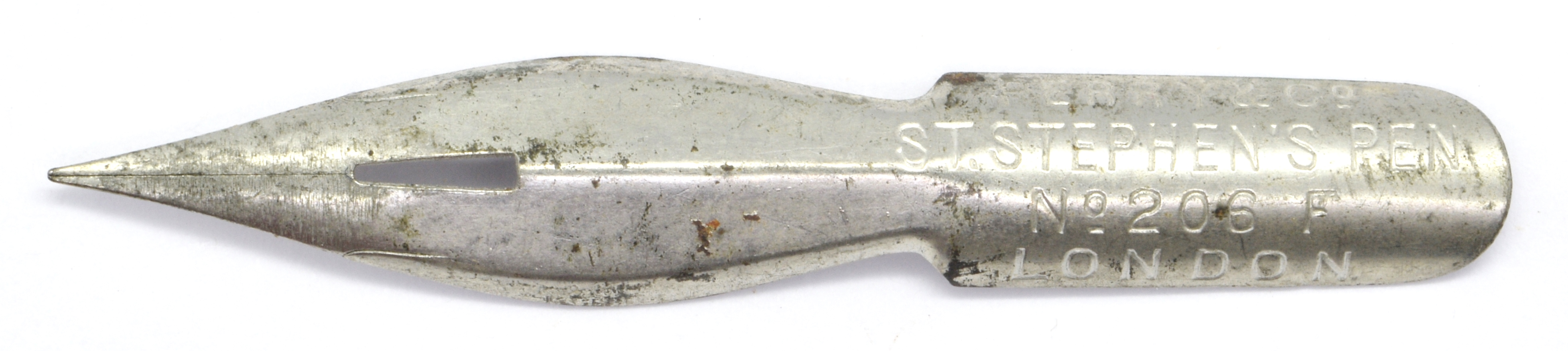
nº 206 St. Stephen's

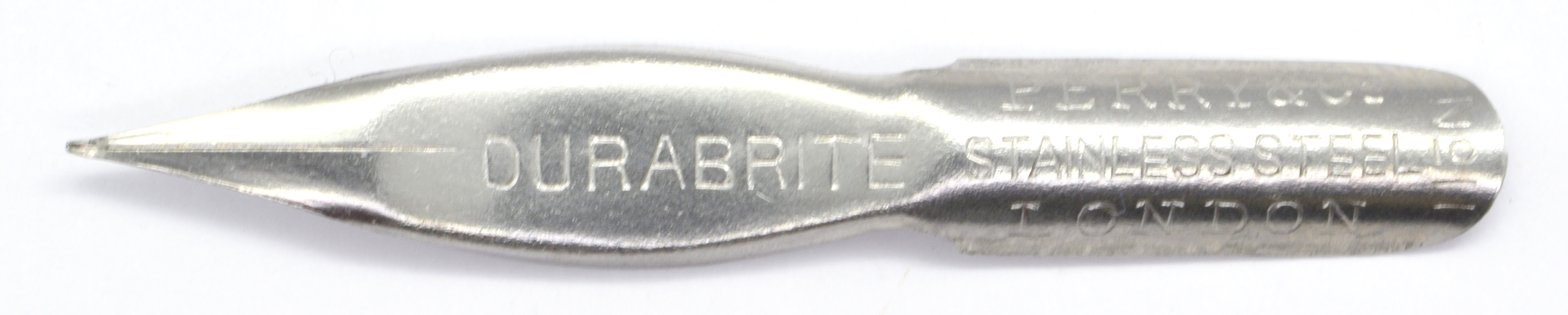
nº 11 Durabrite

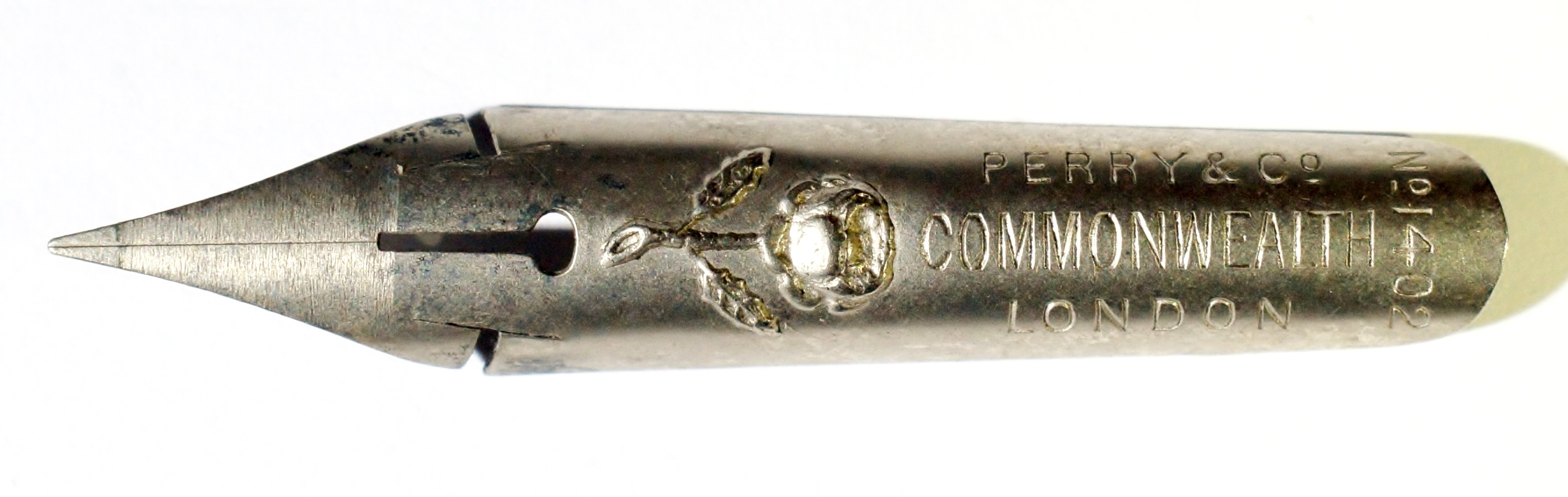
nº 1402 Commonwealth

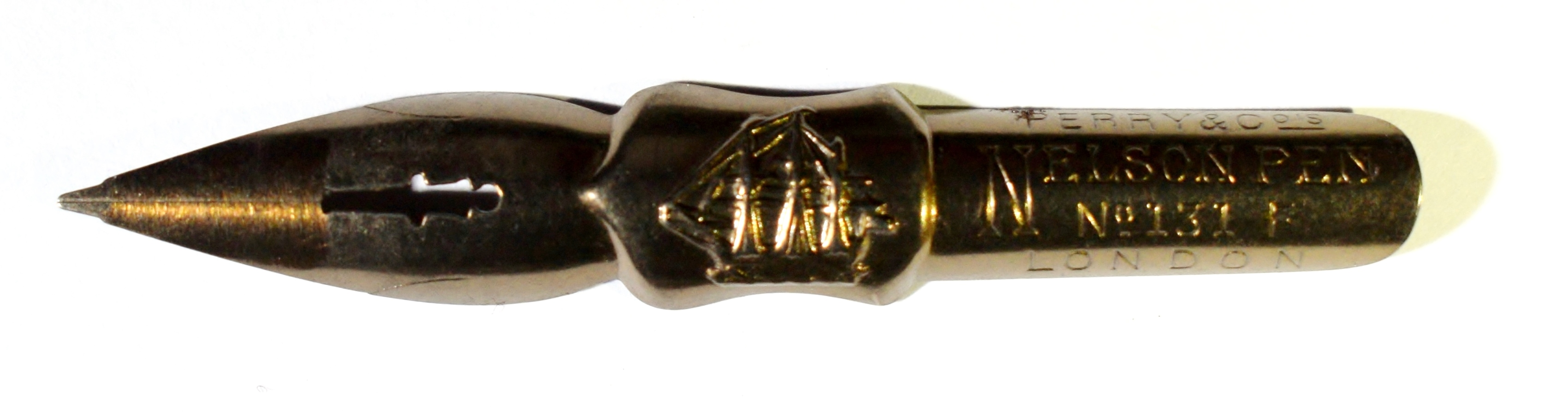
nº 131 Nelson pen

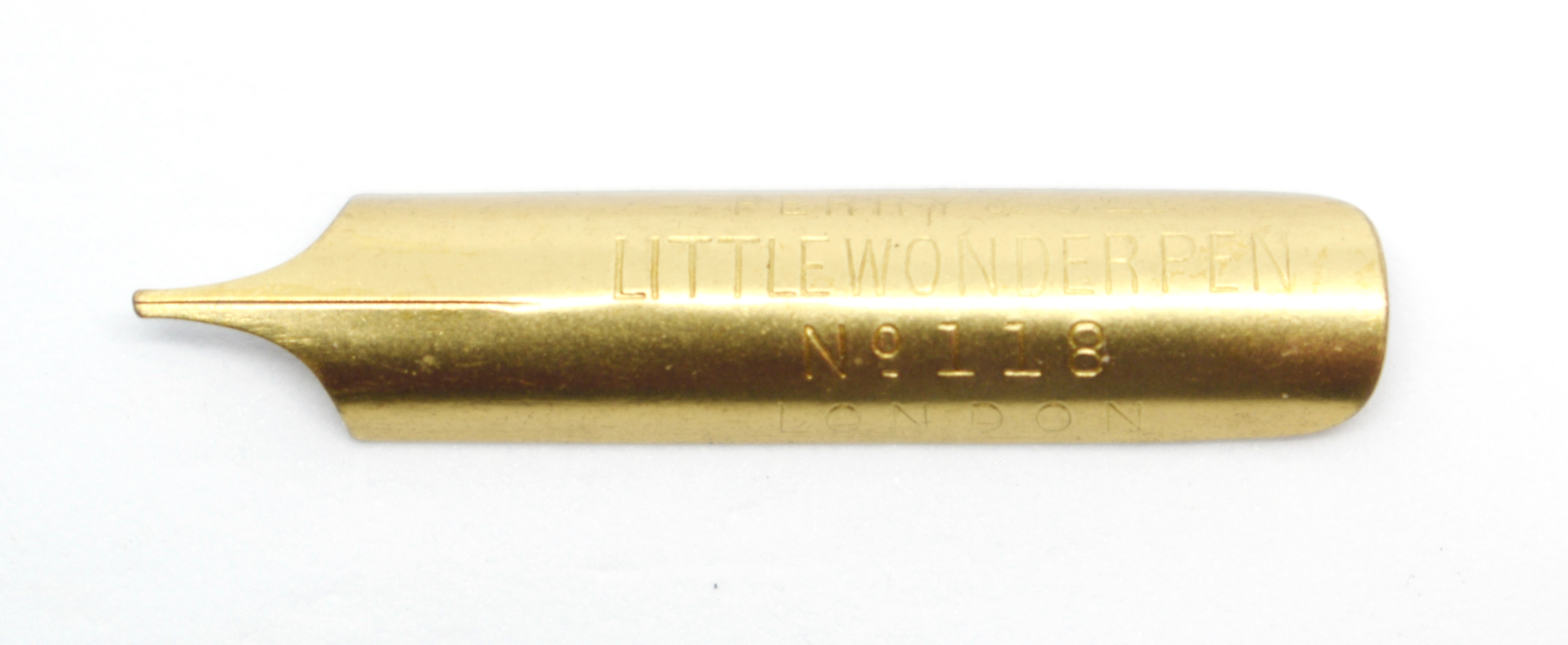
nº 118 Little Wonder pen

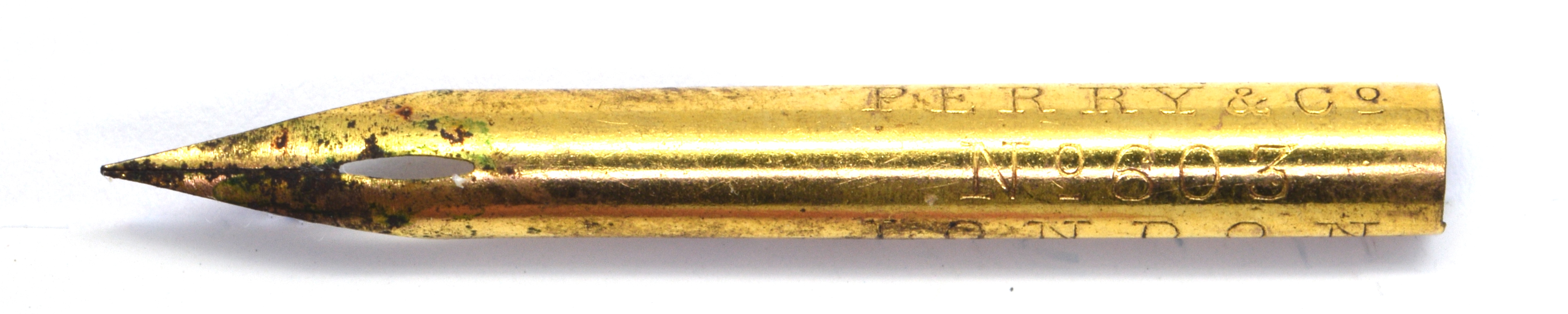
nº 603

== See also ==
- Birmingham pen trade
- Dip pen
- Nib (pen)
