= Joseph Gillott =

English pen-manufacturer and patron of the arts (1799–1872)

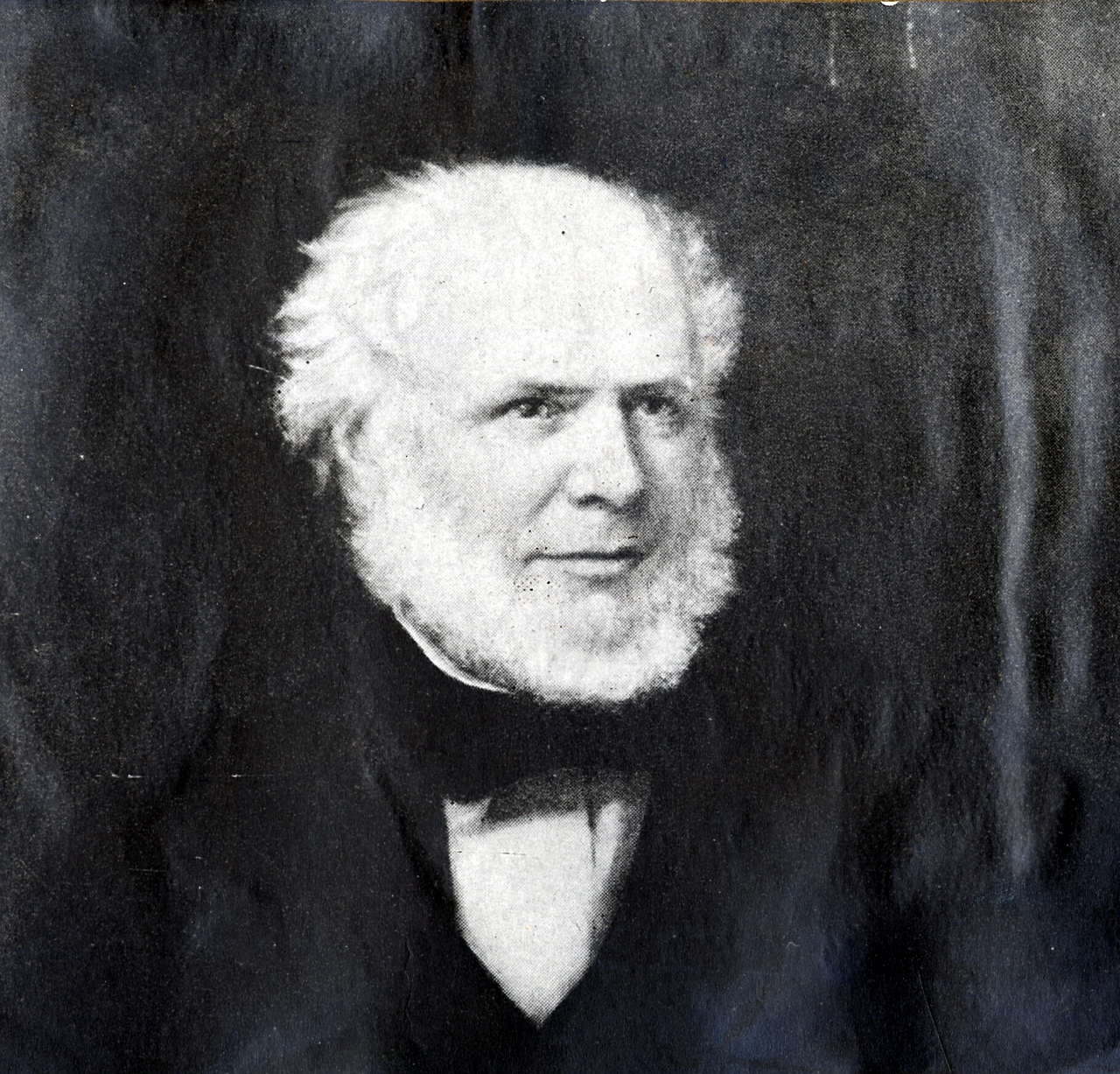
- Portrait of Joseph Gillott.
- Born: 11 October 1799; Sheffield, England
- Died: 5 January 1872 (aged 72)
- Resting place: Key Hill Cemetery
- Known for: Founder of Joseph Gillott's
- Children: Joseph junior

Joseph Gillott (11 October 1799 – 5 January 1872) was an English pen-manufacturer and patron of the arts. He is mostly notable for being the founder of Joseph Gillott's, a dip pen manufacturing company based in Birmingham.

== Pen manufacturing ==
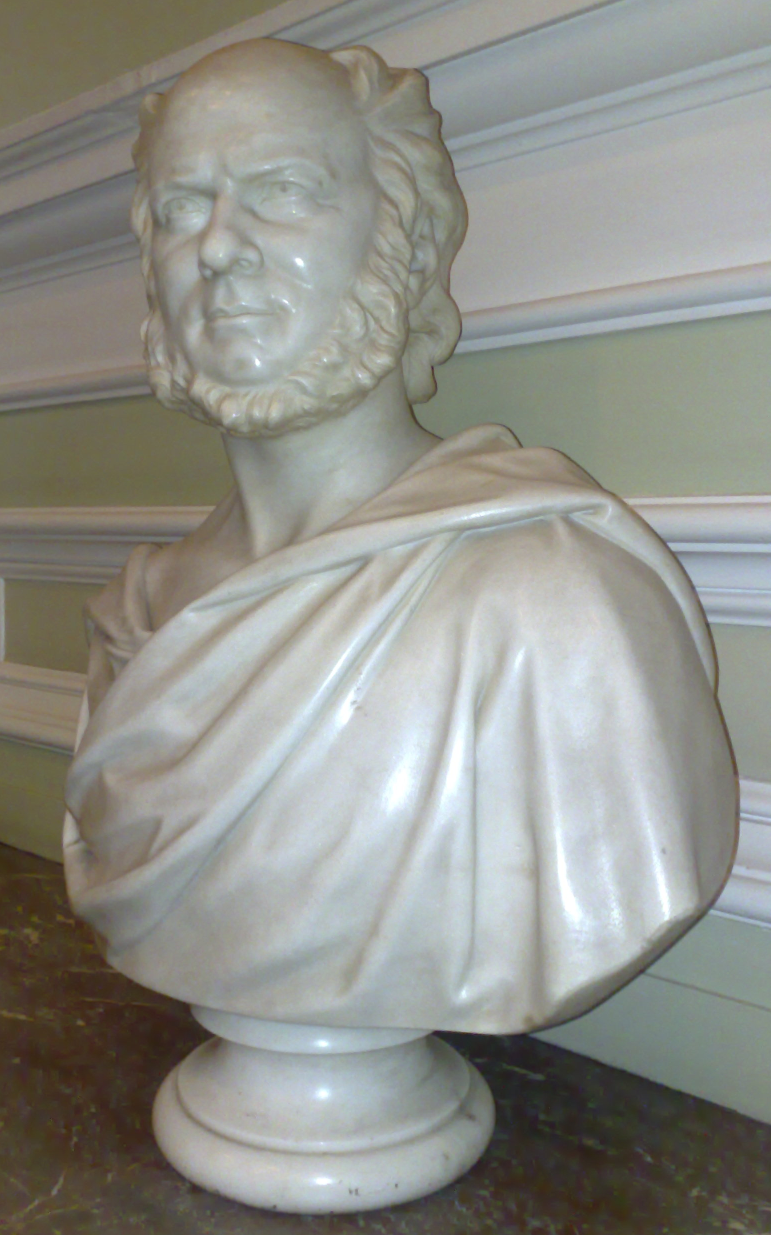
Bust of Gillott in the foyer of the Council House, Birmingham

After a brief period of schooling, Gillott began working in the cutlery trade in his home town of Sheffield. In 1821 he moved to Birmingham, where he found employment in the steel toy trade, the technical name for the manufacture of steel buckles, chains and light ornamental steel-work generally.

About 1830 he turned his attention to the manufacture of steel dip pens by machinery. His company rapidly became successful and Gillott was soon a very wealthy man. It was rumoured locally that he buried some of his money in his cellar so that it did not become known that he had acquired so much. He certainly spread his cash across a number of bank accounts in Birmingham. In 1840 he opened his Victoria Works; the business employed mainly girls. Gillott also invested in the new railway companies and especially in property and land – not only in Birmingham, where he bought a large estate in Edgbaston, but also in London and Wales. The family home for many years was "The Grove" on Westbourne Road in Edgbaston.

Gillott was an often secretive man, both in business and in art collecting. He socialised with a small group of friends at the Hen and Chickens Hotel and the Theatre Royal (which he part-owned) in New Street, Birmingham.

== Art interests ==
Gillott was an art collector – at first he exchanged pens for paintings – and one of the first to recognise the merits of J. M. W. Turner. He also collected paintings by Richard Wilson, Richard Parkes Bonington, Thomas Gainsborough and John Constable. He recognized the work of John Linnell and was the first to give him a good price. His collection of pictures, sold after his death, realised £170,000.

== Death and legacy ==
Gillott died in Birmingham and was buried in Key Hill Cemetery.

A white marble bust of Gillott stands in the main foyer of Birmingham Council House.

In later years, Gillott's son, Joseph Gillott junior, purchased a considerable estate in the village of Catherine-de-Barnes, Solihull on which he built New Berry Hall, a large gothic mansion with North and South Lodges. He also built the school in the village.

A collection of Gillott's letters are held at the Cadbury Research Library, University of Birmingham.

== See also ==
- Birmingham pen trade

== Bibliography ==
- Roberts, Stephen (2016). Joseph Gillott and Four Other Birmingham Manufacturers. Birmingham: Birmingham Biographies. ISBN 9781539483069.
