= Flo-Master =

Brand of inks and markers

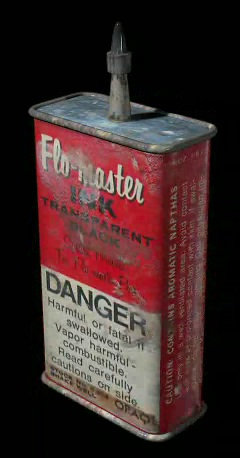
Flo-master ink can rendering by Mike McGetrick.

Flo-Master was a brand of inks and markers in the latter half of the 20th century. These markers were designed for glass, and became popular among graffiti artists in New York City in the 1970s and early 1980s.

== History ==
Cushman & Denison first introduced Flo-Master "refillable markers" in 1951, which targeted store owners and advertisers with limited success. In 1953, Esterbrook America took over the company in the United States, and Esterbrook Pens and Cushman & Denison merged in 1960 in the United Kingdom. To counter a precipitous fall-off in its business following World War II, Esterbrook worked to develop new and innovative products, and the years 1960 to 1967 saw steady progress.

Under the "Gem" brand name, the company launched its highly successful Mark I line of products, featuring the "Valve Marker" and the "Permanent Pen." Flo-Master brand inks were used in many of these products, and was also sold separately for refills, marketed in handy tin cans equipped with "needle-nose" plastic nozzles. In 1967, the Venus Pencil Company bought out the Esterbrook Pen Company, resulting in the formation of Venus Esterbrook.

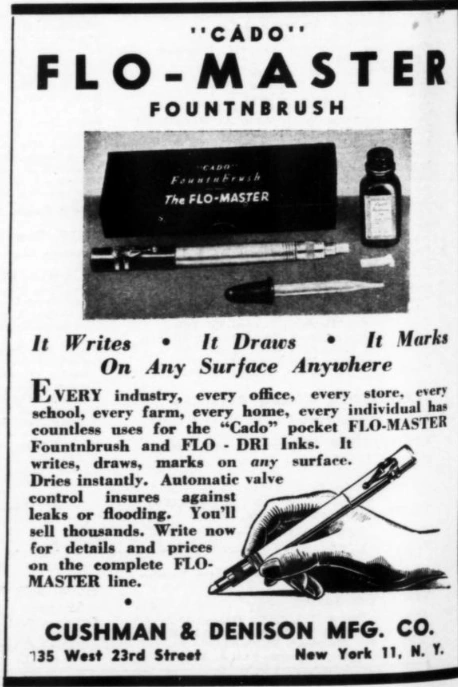
Advertisent of Flo-Master Fountbrush pen "Cado" from Hardware Age (July 18, 1946)

== Impact ==
In the Russian language, фломастер (flomaster) has become a common name for any marker pen (regardless of actual brand). The same is true for many other Slavic languages, e. g. Ukrainian, Bosnian, Bulgarian, Croatian, Serbian or Slovene, the Baltic languages (Lithuanian and Latvian), as well as in other languages of the former USSR. Polish language uses similar term, slightly modified phonetically: flamaster.

In the mid-1960s, the psychedelic liquid light show as visual accompaniment to live electric music became a feature of gigs and Flo-master inks were often used, due to the intensity of their colour and the convenience of the nozzle feature on the refill cans.

When street-writing took to the subways in New York City at the start of the 1970s, Flo-Master opaque inks were chosen by graffiti artists, as they adhered to virtually any surface permanently. In addition, the ink was not only opaque on glass, but also covered up pre-existing writing.

Flo-Master inks were not only colorful and durable; in addition, the design of their cans allowed for portability, quick refilling and artful "pointing" and "edging" of "Uni-Wide" and "Mini-Wide" markers—designed for "ribbon"-style writing on glass—which were extremely popular with early graffiti writers as well.

== Decline ==
Due to its high lead content—the ingredient which gave Flo-Master inks their distinctive attributes—production was suspended by regulation.
