= Heintze & Blanckertz =

German pen manufacturing company

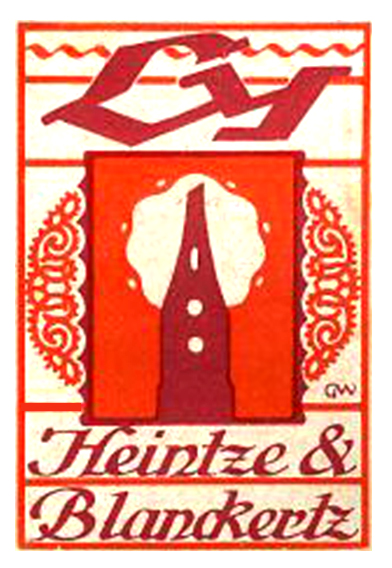
old advertising for dip pens

Heintze & Blanckertz was the first German manufacturer of dip pens. It was founded in 1842 in Oranienburg near Berlin. Today the company is located in Wehrheim near Frankfurt.

== History ==
"Heintze & Blanckertz - erste deutsche Schreibfederfabrik" was founded in 1842. Dip pens were important as the only other writing tool was the quill. The company sold their products through own offices in Berlin, Leipzig and Frankfurt. Since the 1920s the company cooperated with famous graphic designers like Rudolf Koch, Paul Renner and Edward Johnston and expanded on the arts and crafts sector.

In 1926 Heintze & Blanckertz started to publish the design magazine Die zeitgemäße Schrift and three years later the Rudolf Blanckertz Schriftmuseum (museum of writing) was opened in Berlin. In World War II the factory in Oranienburg was bombed out and the remaining machines were confiscated by the Red Army.

The factory was re-opened in West Berlin and moved later to Frankfurt, but the ballpen limited the use of dip pens, so the company's activities are today more on the arts and crafts sector. It also produces materials for artists and craftspeople.

The graphic collection of Rudolf Blanckertz is now part of the permanent exhibition of the Gutenberg Museum in Mainz.
