= Byron B. Goldsmith =

American inventor and businessman (d. 1927)

Byron Benjamin Goldsmith (1865 or 1866 – September 8, 1927) was an American chemist and inventor who was Vice President of the American Lead Pencil Company.

Goldsmith was born in New York City, the brother of Terese Goldsmith (who married jurist and Municipal Court Justice Frederick Spiegelberg), Amy Goldsmith (who married John H. Allen) and Samuel Maitland Goldsmith, a stockbroker. He lived from his tenth year till his death at their family home at 19 East 74th Street, Manhattan.

Goldsmith was a graduate of a Berlin University (possibly the present Humboldt University of Berlin), and the Columbia University School of Mines, class of 1887. At the latter he studied chemistry and was a member of Phi Gamma Delta. He was an experimental chemist, the subject of his patents ranging from pens and pencils and cases therefor to methods for making rubber bands, carbon paper and various new synthetic compounds. At his death he was Vice President of the American Lead Pencil Company, as well as from 1918 a member of the American Ceramic Society.

At Goldsmith's death, on September 8, 1927, aged 60, his estate was valued at over $900,000. A bachelor, his inheritance instead went to his siblings, extended family, his employees and his servants, as well as $150,000 to his executor, George A. Spiegelberg. He also donated 3,251 volumes to the Columbia University library from his personal collection.
