= D. Leonardt & Co. =

Leonardt Ltd.
- Formerly: D. Leonardt & Co.
- Company type: Private
- Industry: Metallurgy
- Founded: 1856; 170 years ago in Birmingham, England
- Founder: Diedrich Leonardt
- Headquarters: Highley, Shropshire, England
- Area served: Worldwide
- Products: Current: Corner parts; Former: Dip and fountain pen nibs, ballpoint pens, nib holders, mechanical pencils
- Website: leonardt.com

Leonardt Ltd. (formerly D. Leonardt & Co.) is an English manufacturing company that specializes in finishing of metal components, manufacturing products such as corners for stationery such as leathergoods, photograph albums, menu covers, pattern and carpet books, binders and portfolios.

The company also produced writing implements that included dip and fountain nibs, ballpoint pens, pen holders and mechanical pencils, which set Leonardt as one of the oldest manufacturers of dip pens, having produced them since its establishment in 1856.

== History ==
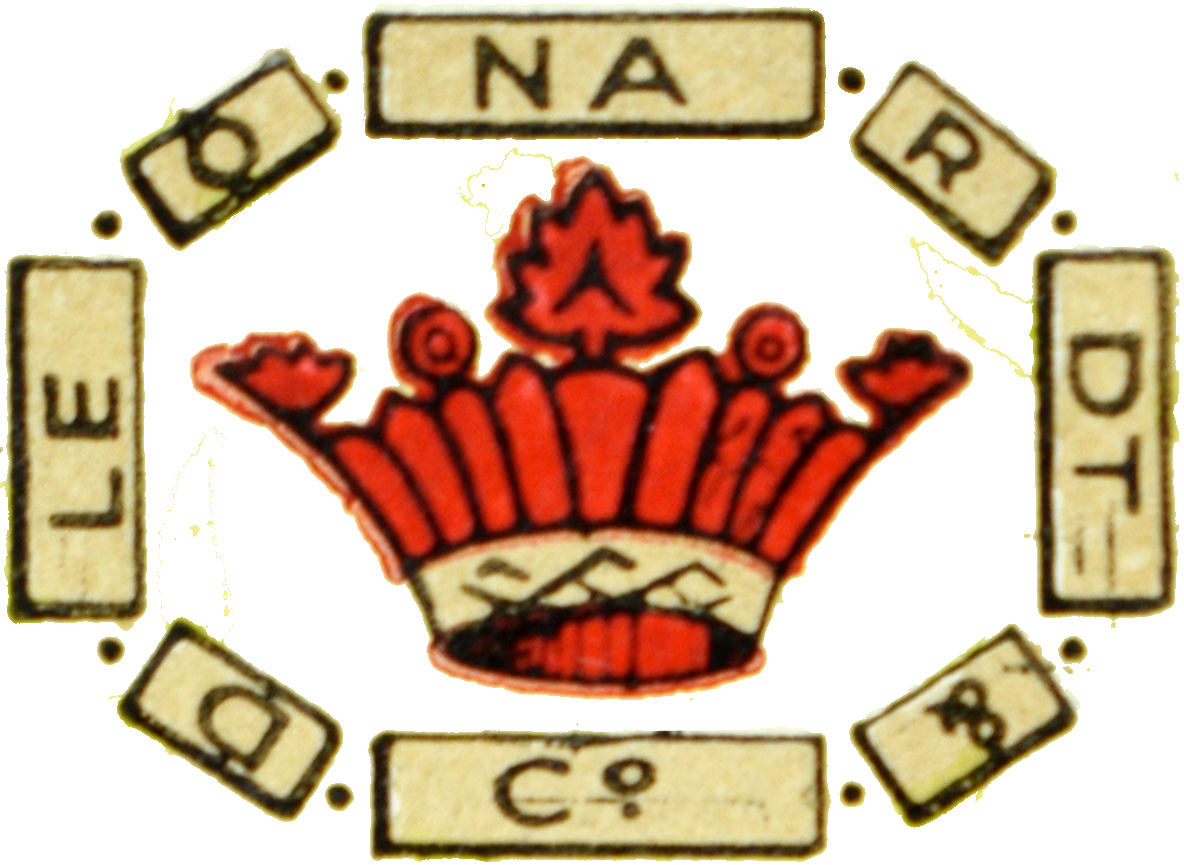
Former Leonardt logo

The company was founded in 1856 by Diedrich Leonardt to manufacture dip pens. After two large expansions led by Leonardt in 1863 and 1867, D Leonardt & Co. developed large export market in South America and Eastern Europe, and produced pens for the King of Italy. The manufactured pens were considered to be of high quality and included their famous patent ballpoint pens, such as the "Automatic Wonder Pen", a new type of fountain pen introduced in 1871.

Despite most manufacturers of nibs established in Birmingham having since closed their factories, Leonardt & Co. is one of the few companies that have remained in the industry since its founding, although the company ceased to produce pens.

The Leonardt brand is currently produced by the Manuscript Pen Company, established in 1980. and based in Highley

The only other British company that currently manufactures dip pens is William Mitchell (Calligraphy) through its brands Joseph Gillott's and William Mitchell.

== Pen models ==
Some of the dip pen models manufactured by the Manuscript Pen Company Ltd under licence from D. Leonardt are:

Image	Model
	6H - Extra fine drawing nib, nickel
	30 ("Point"), nickel
	33 ("Copying"), nickel
	40 ("Pumpking"), fine, blue finish
	41 ("Crown"), fine point, with collar body
	63.5 ("School"), nickel
	70 ("Ornamental") - Oblique with top reservoir, bronze
	111 - Nickel and gilding
	251 ("Scroll") - for decorative borders, gilding
	256 ("Drawing") - gilt, nickel, and bronze

Image	Model
	260/265 ("Poster") - Flat-shape pen, brass and gilding
	300 ("Ball point"), nickel
	400 ("Ornamental"), polished
	518 ("Lithographic"), bright
	700 - Extra fine drawing nib, nickel
	800/801 ("Mapping") - Crowquill type, extrafine, bronze
	"Index" - Decorative, bronze
	"Principal" - Extrafine, bronze
	"Shakespeare" - Decorative, bronze, nickel and gilding

Some models historically produced by D. Leonardt:

Image	Model
6H	516 ("Eureka") - Spherical point
	526 - Spherical point

Image	Model
	2300 ("Round") - Traditional calligraphy, nickel
