= Dip pen =

Writing instrument

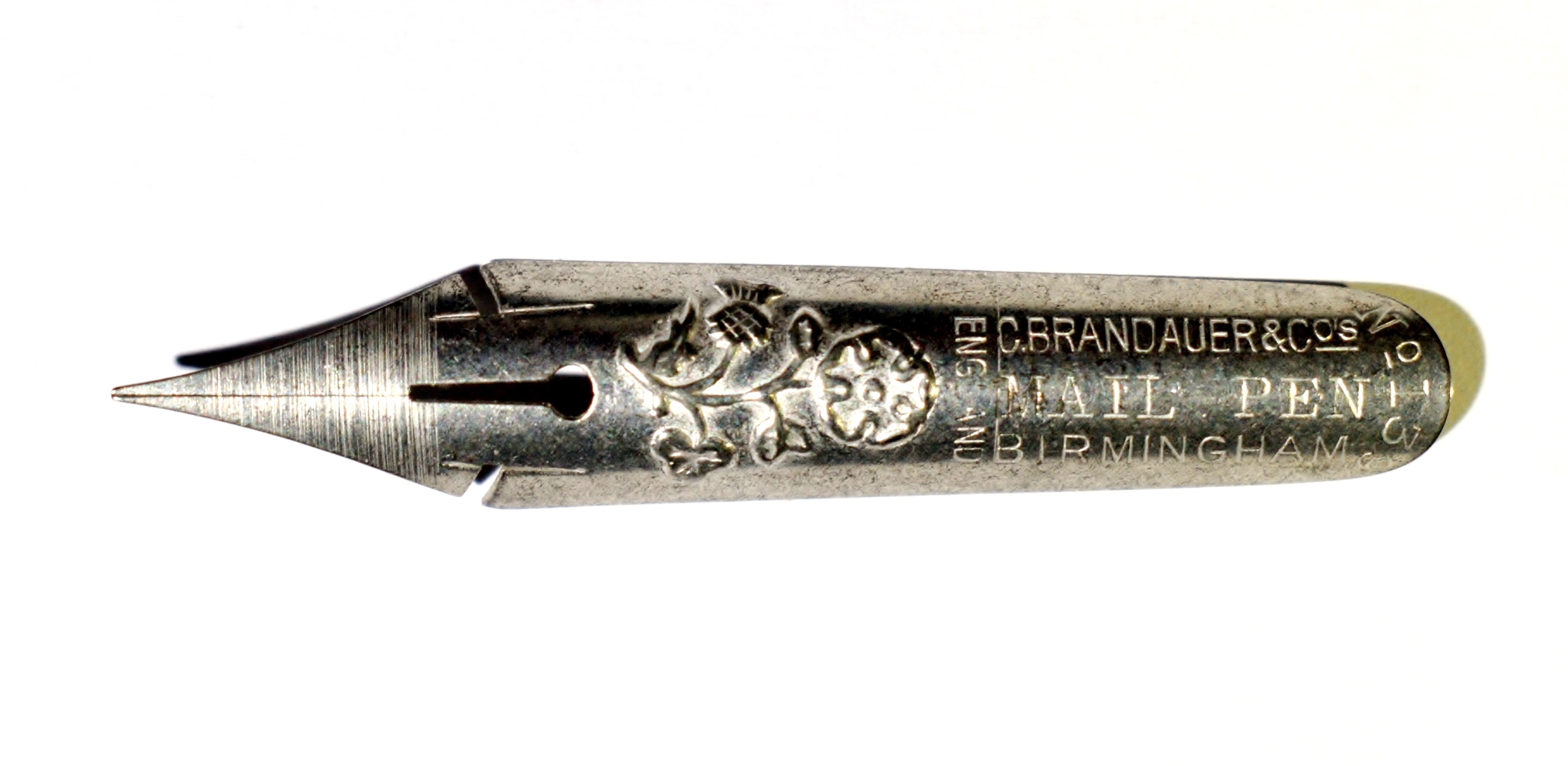
- "Mail" pen by C. Brandauer & Co.
- Type: Pen
- Inventor: Bryan Donkin (Note: Donkin was the first to patent a metal nib in 1803, although he could not exploit it commercially.)
- Inception: 1792; 234 years ago (modern era) (Note: The date refers to an advertisement published on British newspaper The Times. There are also records of a metal dip pen patented in 1803, but the first manufacturer to market mass-produced dip pens was John Mitchell in 1822.)
- Manufacturer: Gillott; Kaweco; Speedball; Zebra
- Available: Yes

A dip pen is a writing instrument used to apply ink to paper by dipping into an inkwell. Dip pens usually consist of a metal nib with a central slit that acts as a capillary channel like those of fountain pen nibs, mounted in a handle or holder, usually made of wood. Other materials can be used for the holder, including bone, horn, metal and plastic, with some dip pens being made entirely of glass.

Generally dip pens have no ink reservoir except for a small hole, indent, or pocket where a drop of ink is held by capillary action, so the user must frequently refill the ink from an inkwell or bottle to continue drawing or writing. Sometimes a simple metal reservoir can be clipped to the top of the pen, allowing for several sentences of uninterrupted use. While refilling can be done by dipping into an inkwell, it is also possible to charge the pen with an eyedropper or a brush, which gives more control over the amount of ink applied. Thus, "dip pens" are not necessarily dipped; many illustrators call them nib pens.

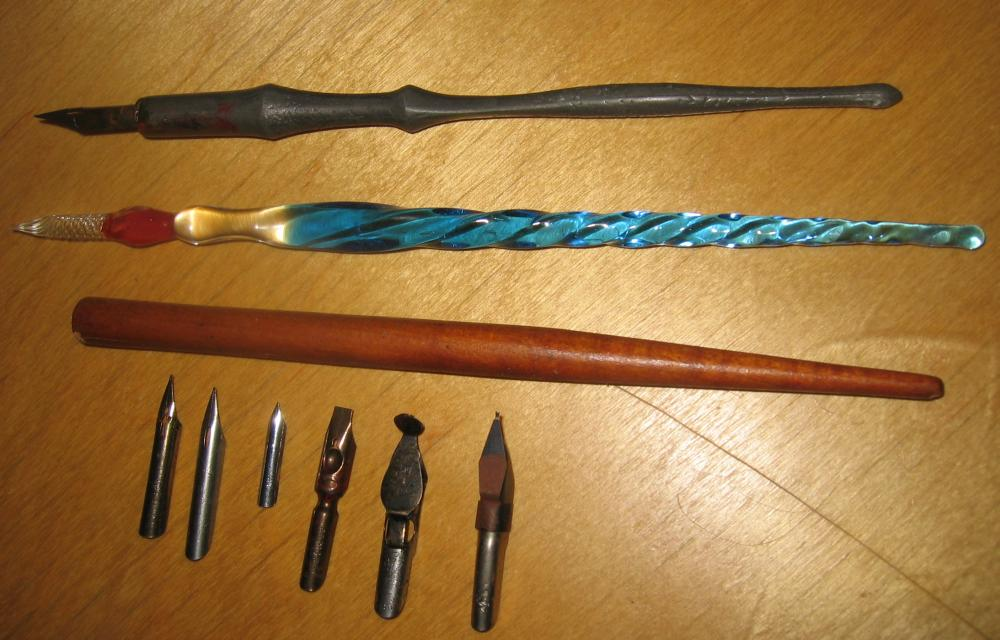
A metal dip pen, glass dip pen, and pen holder along with an assortment of metal nibs.

While metal dip pens have existed since antiquity, pens with mass-produced replaceable nibs emerged in the early 19th century, when they supplanted feather quill pens and in some parts of the world, reed pens. Dip pens were widely used well into the 20th century, only gradually being displaced with the development of fountain pens in the very late 19th century, and are now mainly used in illustration, calligraphy, and comics.

While a fountain pen offers the convenience of less frequent refills, the dip pen has certain advantages over a fountain pen. A dip pen can use waterproof, pigmented, iron gall ink, particle-and-binder-based inks (such as India ink), drawing ink, and acrylic inks with ease. While fountain pens generally must use water based inks, and pigmented and waterproof inks can only be used with sufficient cleaning to prevent the pen's feed from clogging. Steel and brass dip pen nibs may corrode when used with iron gall ink, but this is not as problematic, as the nib of a dip pen is often cleaned after each use, and is easily replaced. Flexible dip pen nibs allow for the production of a line that naturally varies in thickness.

There is a wide range of interchangeable nibs for dip pens, so different types of lines and effects can be created. The nibs and handles are far cheaper than most fountain pens, and allow color changes much more easily.

== History ==
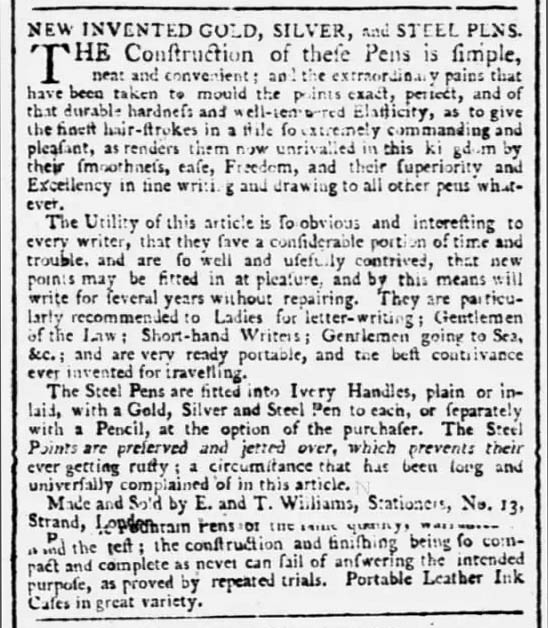
"New invented gold, silver, and steel pens". Ad published in The Times, 1792

Primitive versions of metal dip pens have existed since ancient times but were not widely used due to the unfeasibility of mass production. The earliest known split-nib metal dip pen is a surviving solid copper-alloy pen found in Roman Britain (AD 43 to 410). A copper nib was found in the ruins of Pompeii, showing that metal nibs were in use in AD 79. Several nibs forged from rolled strips of wrought iron were found at the Roman site of Vindolanda. Several other surviving solid metal and removable-nib pens from the Middle Ages and Renaissance have been found, suggesting they were used alongside quill pens.

Centuries later, there is a reference to 'a silver pen to carry inke in', written by the famous diarist, Samuel Pepys in August 1663. The first use of steel pen is attested in Daniel Defoe's book A Tour Through the Whole Island of Great Britain – 1724–26. In Letter VII Defoe wrote: "the plaster of the ceilings and walls in some rooms is so fine, so firm, so entire, that they break it off in large flakes, and it will bear writing on it with a pencil or steel pen." In 1792, 'New invented' metal pens are advertised in The Times newspaper. (Note: The advertisement implies metal nibs had been in use for some years, but had not been generally accepted due to lack of flexibility and tendency to rust. It refers to 'Ivory Handles' with 'Gold Silver or Steel Pens to each', and says that 'new pens may be fitted in at pleasure', indicating that only the nibs were metal. It also claims the pens have 'well-tempered Elasticity' and that the 'Steel Points' are treated to be rustproof, rust being 'a circumstance that has been long and universally complained of in this article'.) A metal pen nib was patented in 1803 by Bryan Donkin, but the patent was not commercially exploited. The patent for the manufacture of metal pens was advertised for sale in 1811. (Note: He offered the patent, which had an unexpired term of 11 years, for sale together with the 'utensils peculiarly adapted to the manufacturing' of the metal pens.) John Mitchell of Birmingham started to mass-produce pens with metal nibs in 1822, and after that, the quality of steel nibs improved enough so that dip pens with metal nibs came into general use. (Note: In 1832 a woman accused of stealing a silver pen from a London shop said in her defence that she had 'one of the common metal pens' with her:)

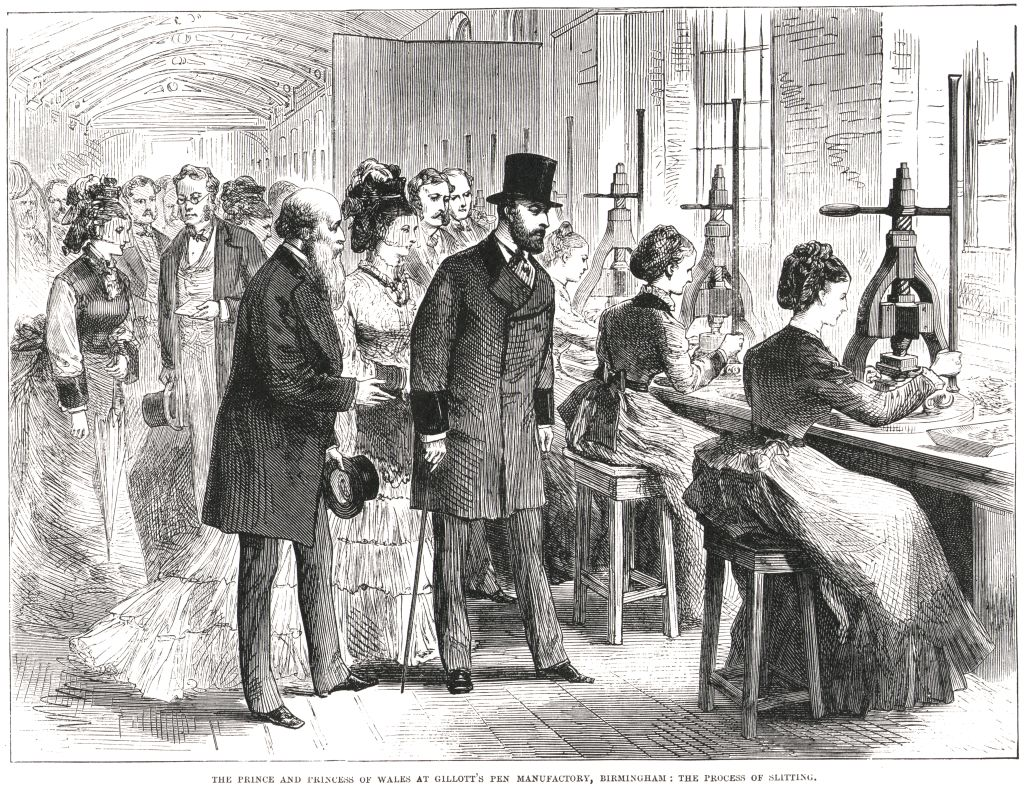
Albert Edward, Prince of Wales, and Princess Alexandra at Gillott's Victoria Works, 1874

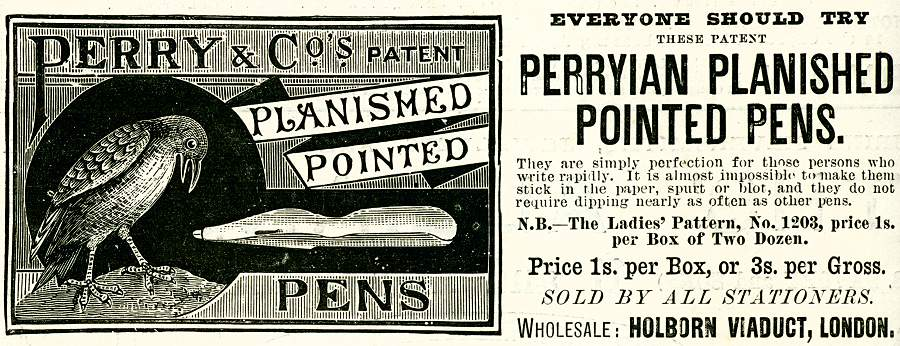
1890 advertisement by Perry & Co.

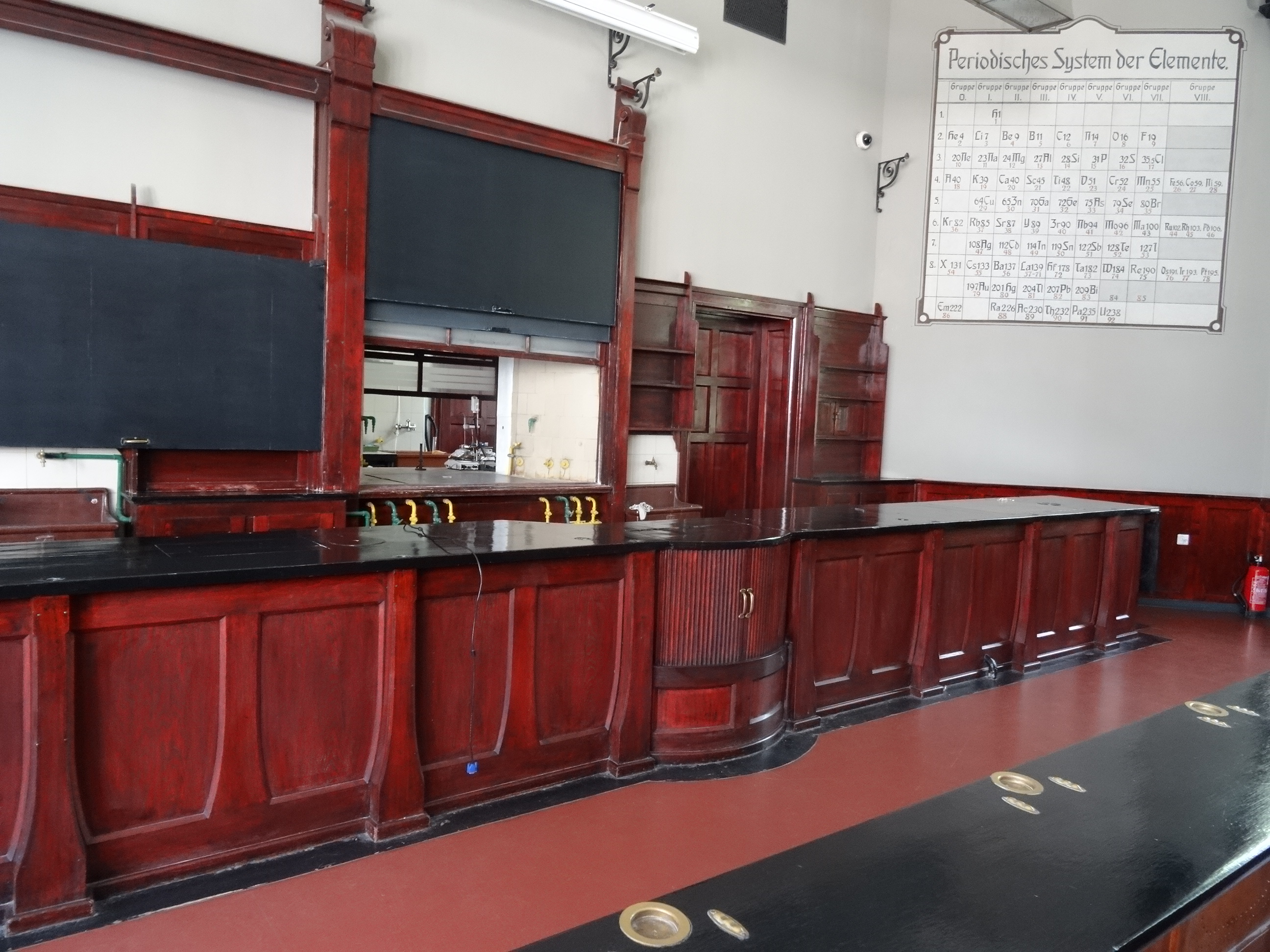
Stands for dip pens and inkwells in the desks of student bench in the historic Chemical Auditorium of Gdańsk University of Technology, 1904

In Newhall Street, John Mitchell pioneered mass production of steel pens in 1822; prior to that the quill pen had been the most common form of writing instrument. His brother William Mitchell later set up his own pen making business in St Paul's square. The Mitchell family is credited as being the first manufacturers to use machines to cut pen nibs, which greatly sped up the process.

The Jewellery Quarter and surrounding area of Birmingham, England was home to many of the first dip pen manufacturers, which some companies establishing there to produce pens. Some of those companies were Joseph Gillott's (established in 1827), Sir Josiah Mason (1827), Hink Wells & Co. (1836), Baker and Finnemore (1850), C. Brandauer & Co. (1850), D. Leonardt & Co. (1856).

Baker and Finnemore operated in James Street, near St Paul's Square. C Brandauer & Co Ltd., founded as Ash & Petit, traded at 70 Navigation Street. Joseph Gillott & Sons Ltd. made pen nibs in Bread Street, now Cornwall Street. Hinks Wells & Co. traded in Buckingham Street, Geo W Hughes traded in St Paul's Square, D. Leonardt & Co./Leonardt & Catwinkle traded in George Street and Charlotte Street, and M Myers & Son. were based at 8 Newhall Street. By 1830 John and William Mitchell, Joseph Gillott and Josiah Mason were the major manufacturers in Birmingham.

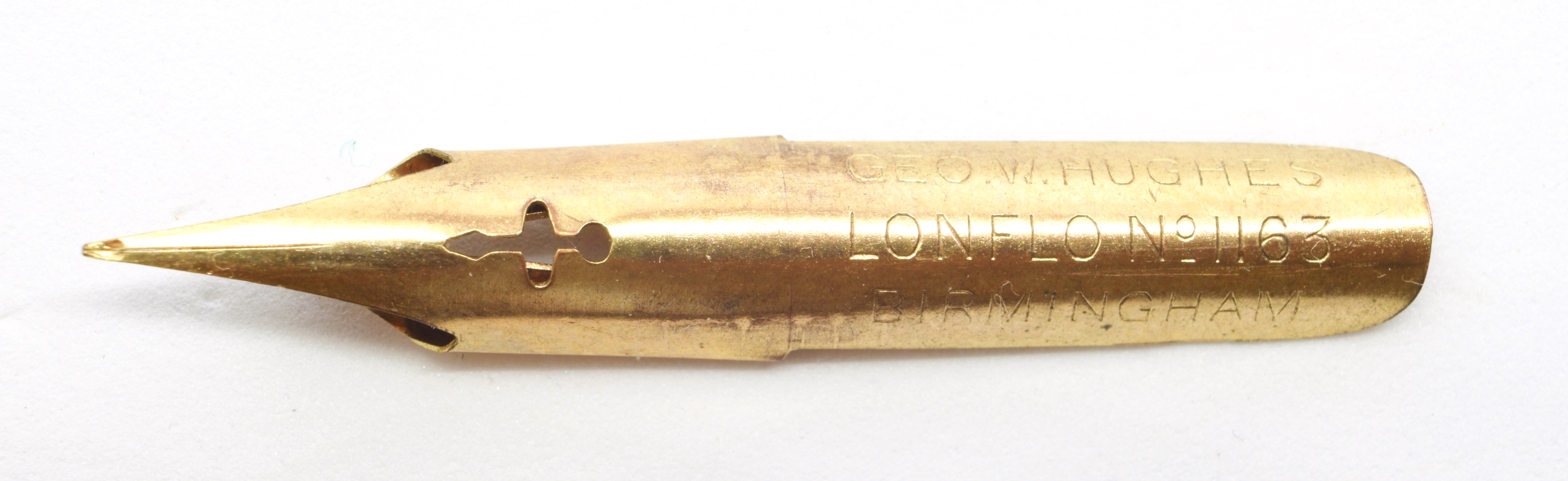
Pen Nº 1163 by George W. Hughes, one of the most notable English pen manufacturers

In Germany the industrial production of dip pens started in 1842 at the factory of Heintze & Blanckertz in Berlin.

By the 1850s, Birmingham was a world centre for steel pen and steel nib manufacture. More than half the steel nib pens manufactured in the world were made in Birmingham. Thousands of skilled craftsmen and women were employed in the industry. Many new manufacturing techniques were perfected in Birmingham, enabling the city's factories to mass produce their pens cheaply and efficiently. These were sold worldwide to many who previously could not afford to write, which encouraged the development of education and literacy. By 1860 there were about 100 companies making steel nibs in Birmingham, but 12 large firms dominated the trade. In 1870 Mason, Sommerville, Wiley, and Perry, merged to form Perry & Co. Ltd. which later became one of the largest manufacturers in the world, with near 2,000 employees.

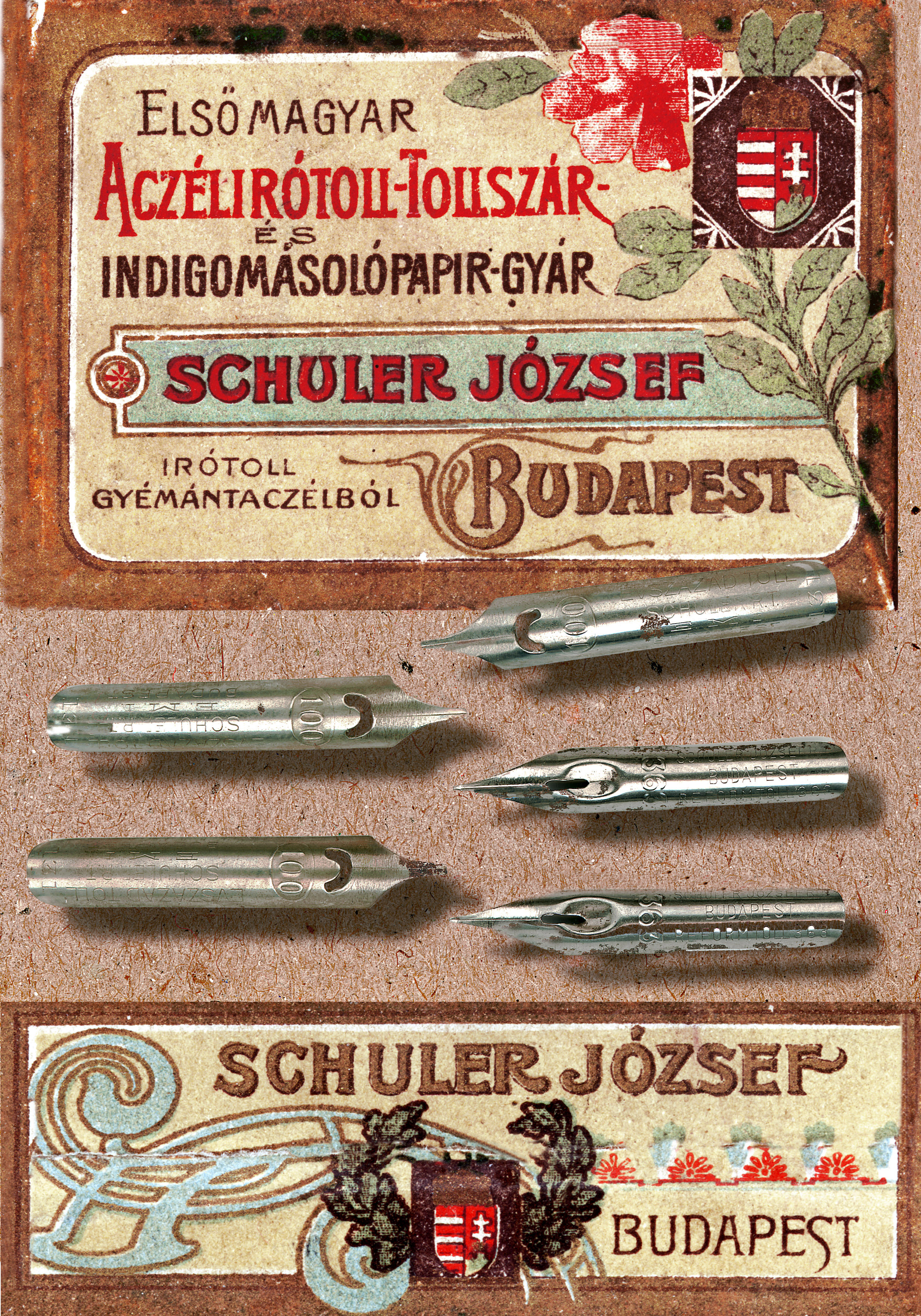
Advertising for pen nibs by Hungarian József Schuler, 1910

Richard Esterbrook manufactured quill pens in Cornwall. In the 19th century, he saw a gap in the American market for steel nib pens. Esterbrook approached five craftsmen who worked for John Mitchell in Navigation Street with a view to setting up business in Camden, New Jersey, US. Esterbrook founded his company in 1858, and it grew to become one of the largest steel pen manufacturers in the world. In 1971 it went out of business.

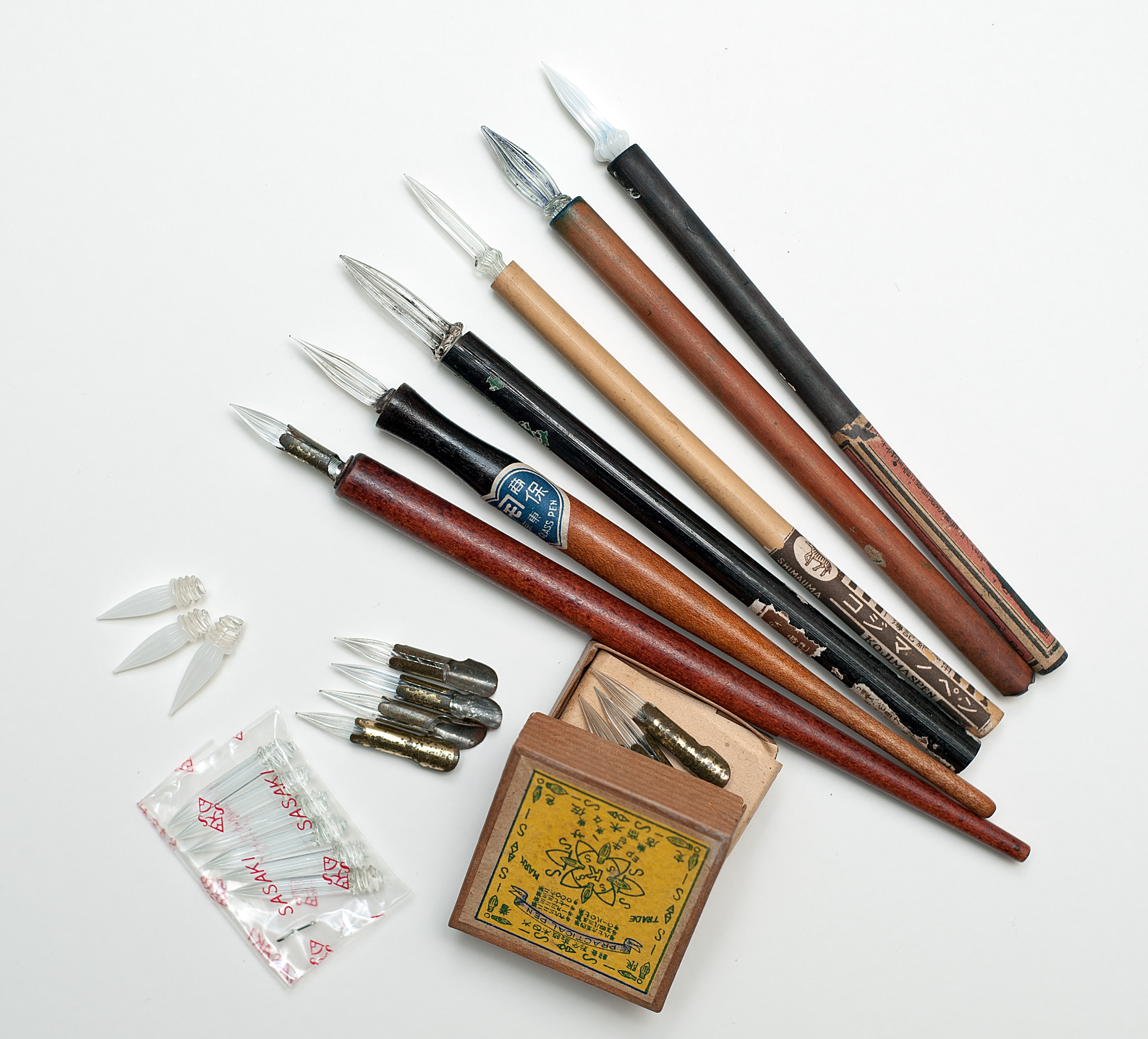
Sase Kogyosho glass nibbed dip pens with bamboo and carved holders

In the late 19th century, various glassmakers in North America, Europe, and Japan began to create glass dip pens. While initial prototypes proved too fragile for writing, innovations in Germany soon meant that they were able to create a pen fit for writing out of a thin glass rod.

The modern shape of the glass dip pen was invented in 1902 by a Japanese wind-chime craftsman named Sadajiro Sasaki, who designed a bamboo pen which featured a long conical nib of grooved glass which guided ink to the tip. These pens were later produced by Sase Kogyosho (佐瀬工業所) a company founded by one of Sasaki's apprentices. This kind of pen gained popularity in Europe and the Empire of Japan during World War I and World War II due to metal rationing, shortages, and material costs. New glass nibbed pens were produced by German companies like Haro and Mont Blanc in the 1930s. While these pens still had traditional pen bodies, full-sized pens entirely made of glass were refined by Imasu Sase, the second generation owner of Sase Kogyosho. Glass dip pens now feature many extravagant designs and unique nib types, they are mainly used by calligraphers or serve as decorative objects.

The oblique dip pen was designed for writing the pointed pen styles of the mid 19th to the early 20th century such as Spencerian Script, although oblique pen holders can be used for earlier styles of pointed penmanship such as the copperplate scripts of the 18th and 19th centuries. As the name suggests, the nib holder holds the nib at an oblique angle of around 55° pointing to the right hand side of the penman. This feature helps greatly in achieving the steep angle required for writing certain scripts, but more importantly, it prevents the right hand nib tine from dragging on the paper as can be experienced when using a straight nib holder with a straight nib for this purpose.

The decreasing production of dip pens and the subsequent demise of the industry in Birmingham is often blamed on the invention of the ballpoint pen in 1938 by the Hungarian Laszlo Biro.

One improved version of the dip pen, known as the original "ballpoint", was the addition of a curved point (instead of a sharp point) which allows the user to have slightly more control on upward and sideways strokes. This feature, however, produces a thicker line rather than the sharp line produced by a sharp point.

== Pen makers ==
The following is a list of some of the most prominent dip pen manufacturers (in past and present times):

Country	Manufacturers (Brands)
Austria	Carl Kuhn & Co., Hiro
Czechoslovakia	Mathias Salcher & Söhne ("Massag")
England	Baker & Finnemore, C. Brandauer & Co., J. Cooke & Sons, Hinks Wells & Co., Joseph Gillott's, Geo W. Hughes, D. Leonardt & Co., Josiah Mason, John Mitchell, William Mitchell, M. Myers & Son, Ormiston & Glass, Perry & Co., A. Sommerville & Co.
France	Baignol et Farjon, Blanzy-Poure, Cie. Francaise, Jacques Herbin, J.B. Mallat, Plumes Parisiennes
Germany	Brause & Co, Heintze & Blanckertz, Kaweco, Hermann Müller, E.W. Leo, F. Soennecken
Japan	Nikko, Tachikawa, Zebra
Spain	Boira, Cervantinas, Campoamor, Daimar, A. Fabre, Goya, Imsa, Jaer, Verabil
Scotland	Macniven & Cameron
United States	Eagle Pencil Co., R. Esterbrook & Co, C. Howard Hunt (Speedball), Turner & Harrison

== Uses ==
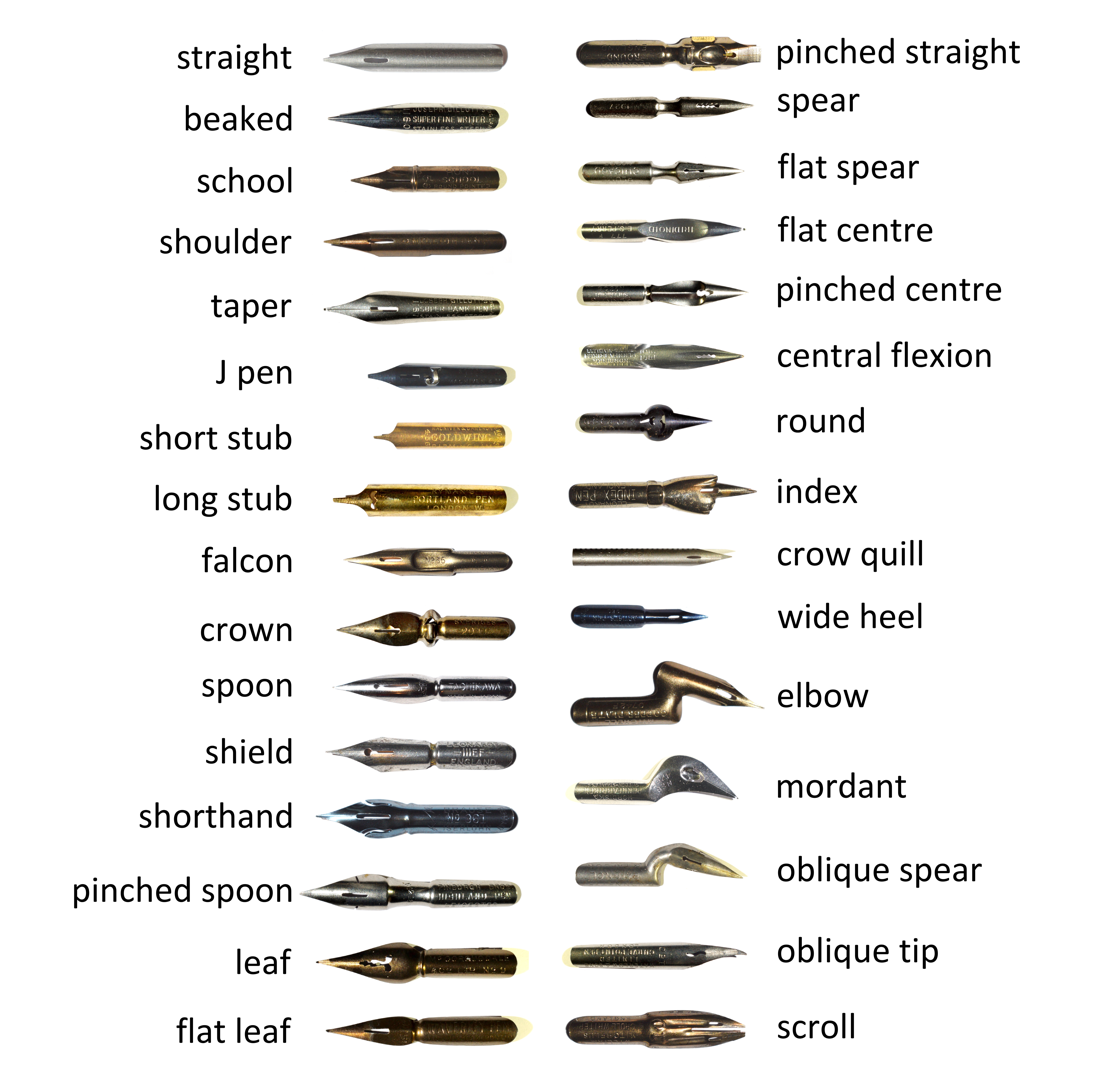
Various models of dip pens

Dip pens continued in use in schools into the 1950s and 1960s, mainly on grounds of cost, since fountain pens were expensive to buy. Even when ballpoint pens became cheaply available, some schools banned their use, perhaps because writing with a dip pen had to be done with greater care. School desks were made with a socket for a small ceramic inkwell which had to be refilled on a daily basis, a task often delegated to one of the pupils.

Dip pens are rarely used now for regular writing, having been replaced by fountain pens, rollerball pens, and ballpoint pens. However, dip pens are still appreciated by artists and calligraphers, as they can make great differences between thick and thin lines, and generally write more smoothly than other types of pens. Dip pens are also preferred by calligraphers for fine writing.

Although most factories ceased manufacturing dip pens, some companies are still active, such as Speedball, Brause (owned by French company Exacompta Clairefontaine), William Mitchell and Joseph Gillott's.

== Gallery ==
Types of dip pen points

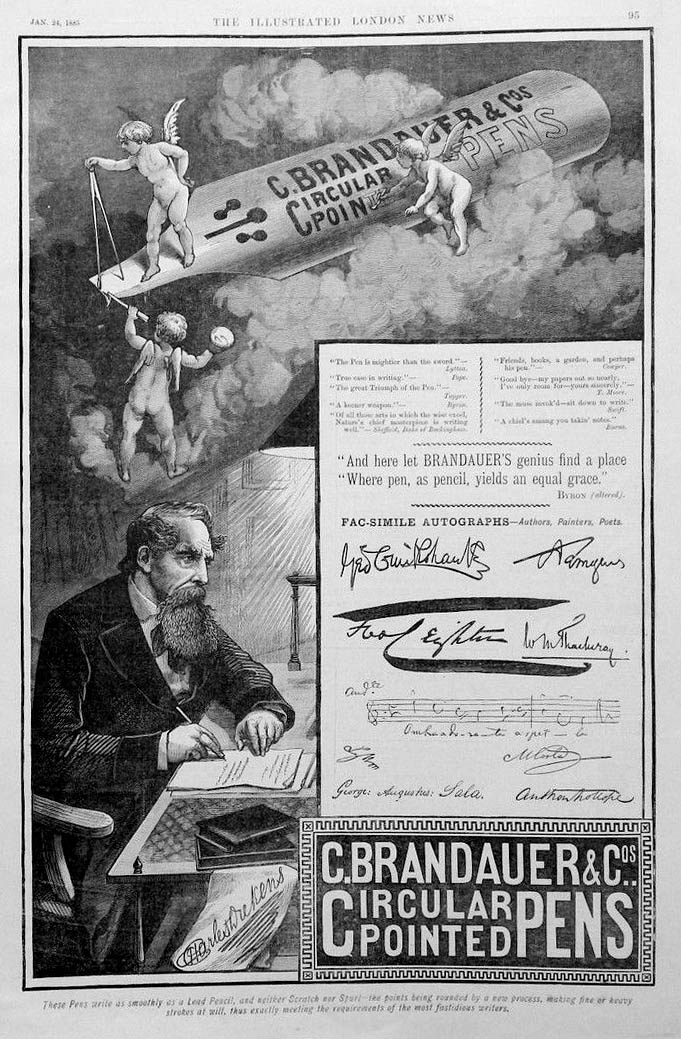
Brandauer & Co. illustrated ad

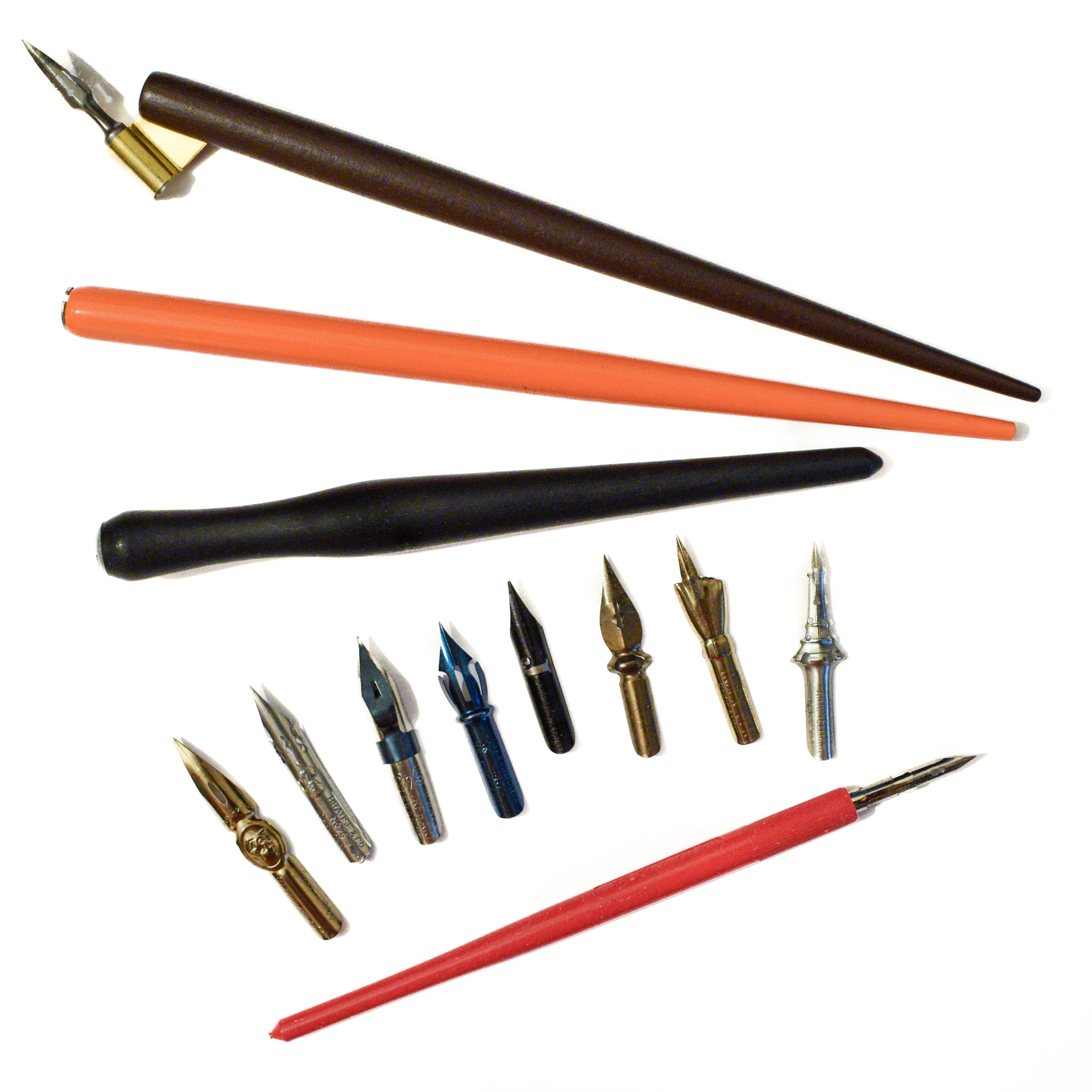
Various pen nibs and penholders

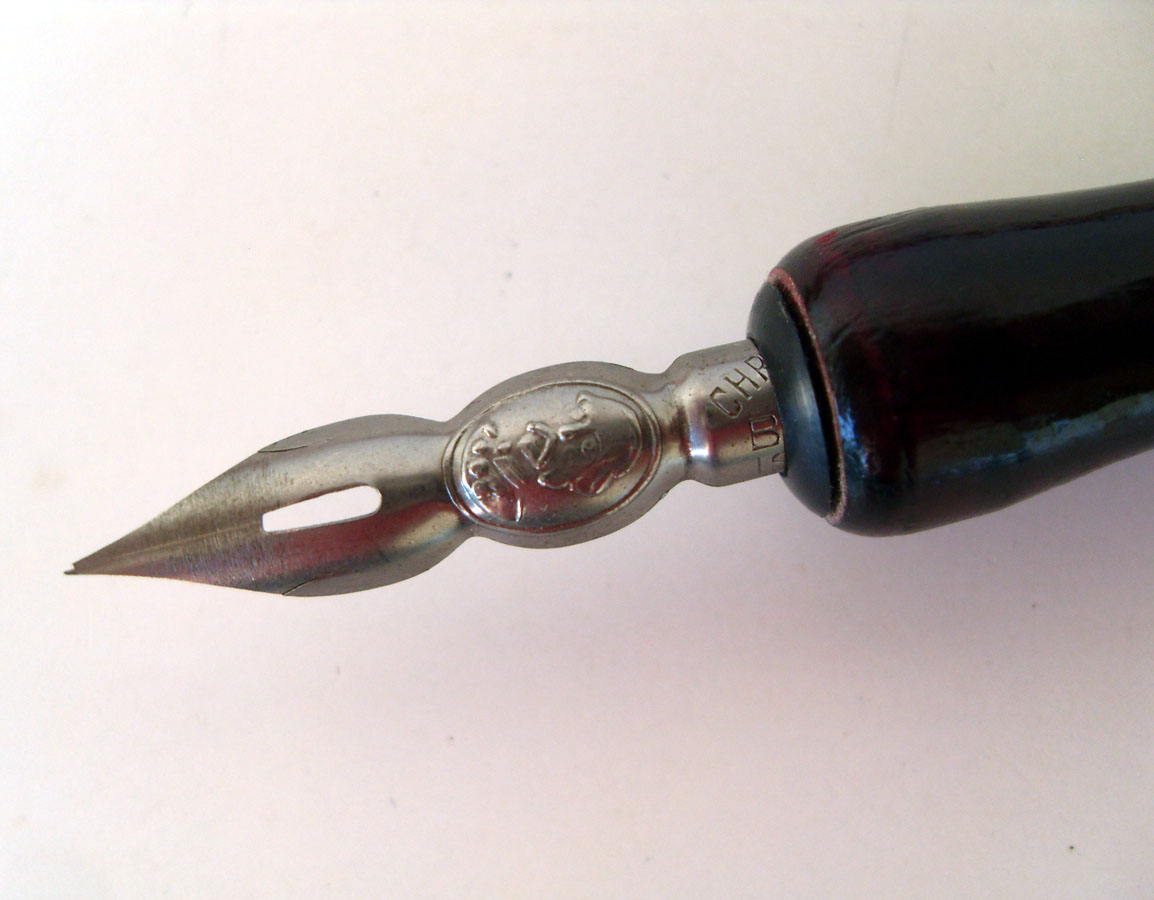
Brause "Christian IX" pen (with portrait carved) and its penholder

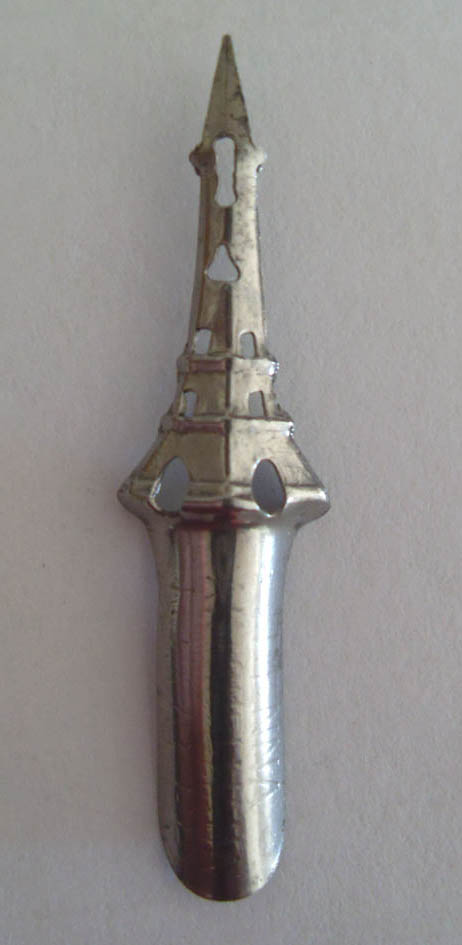
A nib shaped in the form of the Eiffel Tower

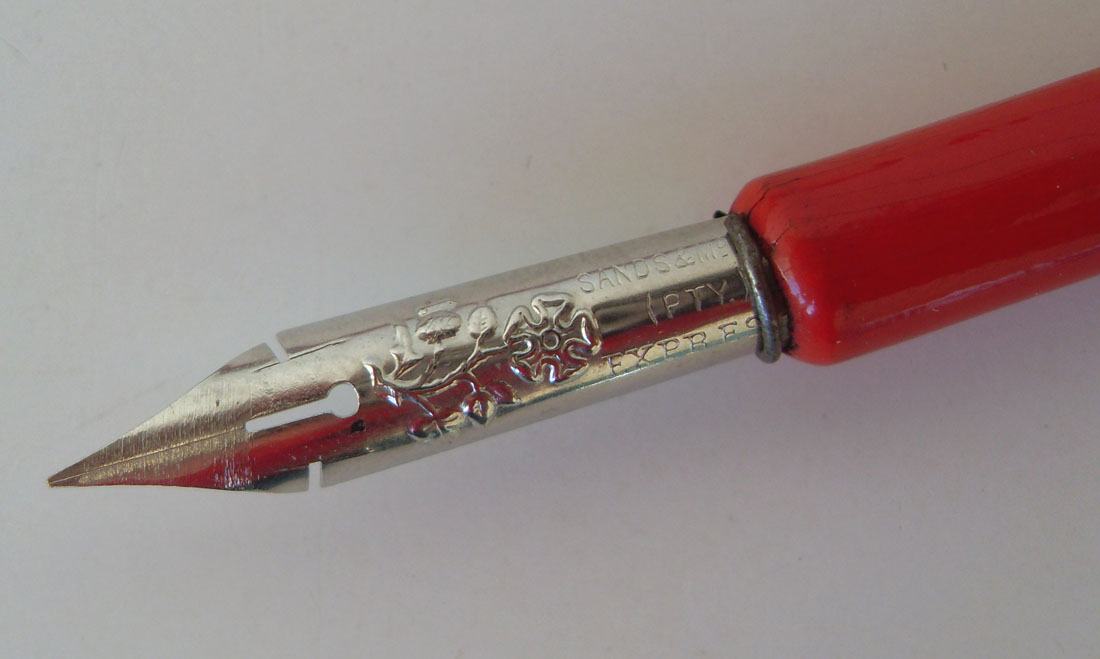
Sand-McDougall carved nib

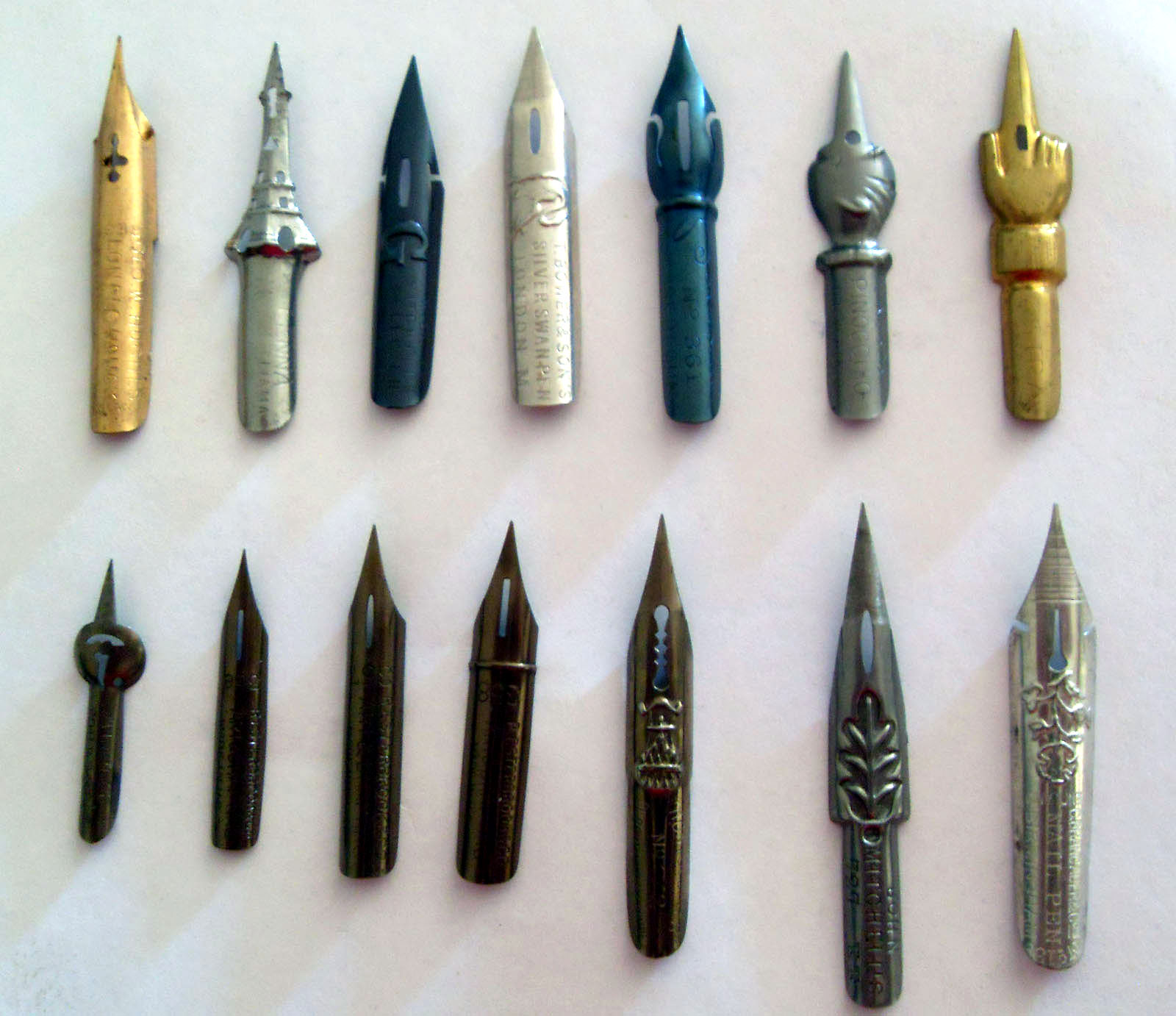
Various nibs of different brands

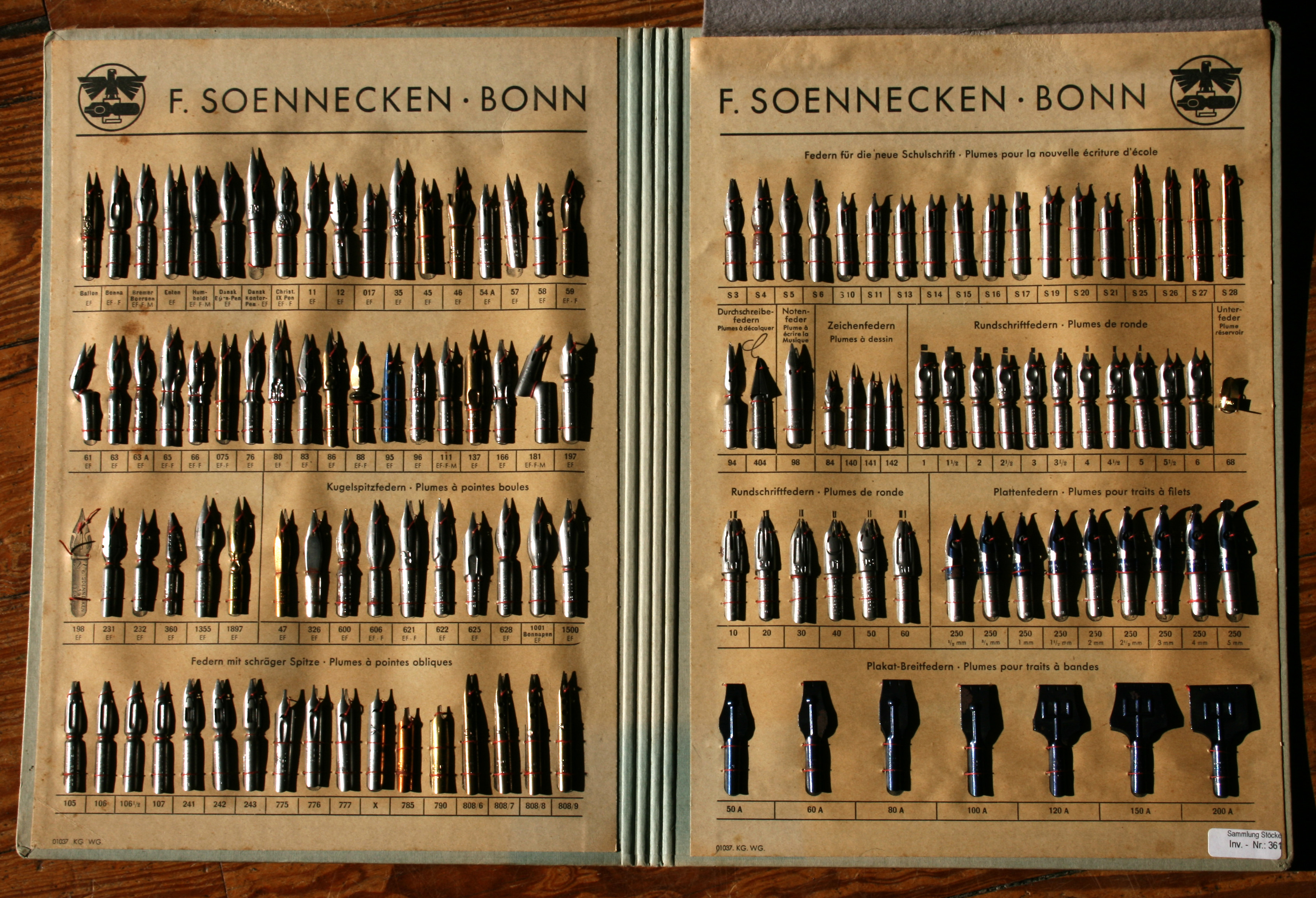
An old Soennecken pens catalog

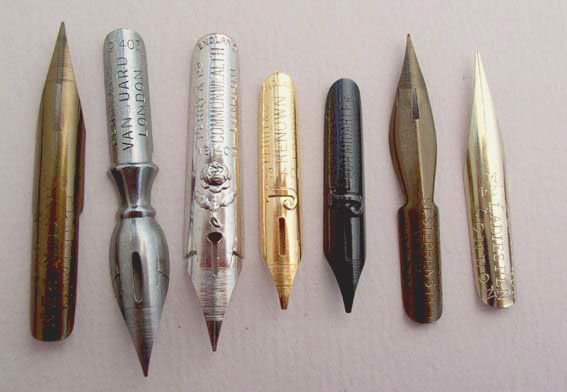
Various Perry nibs

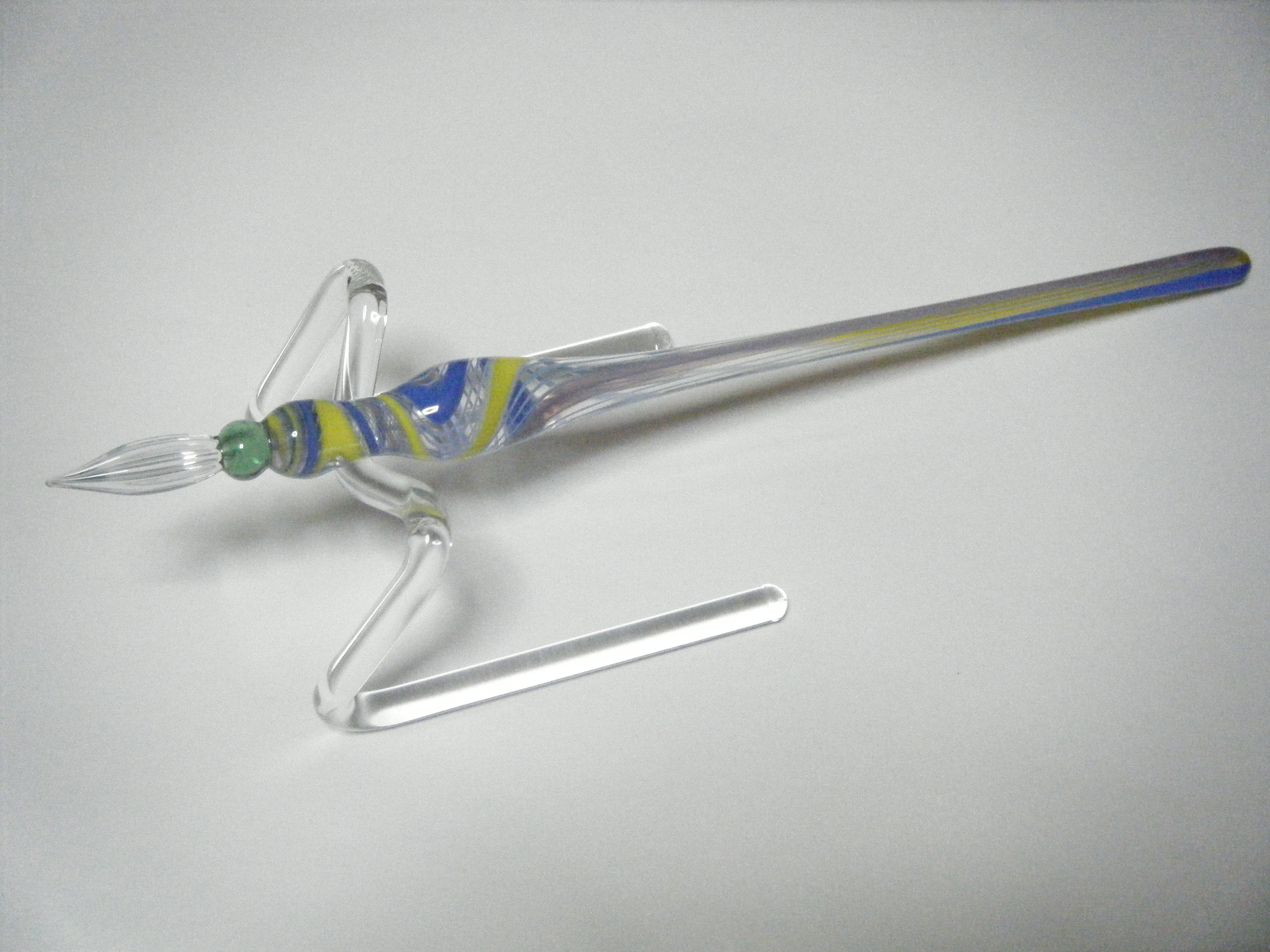
A glass dip pen

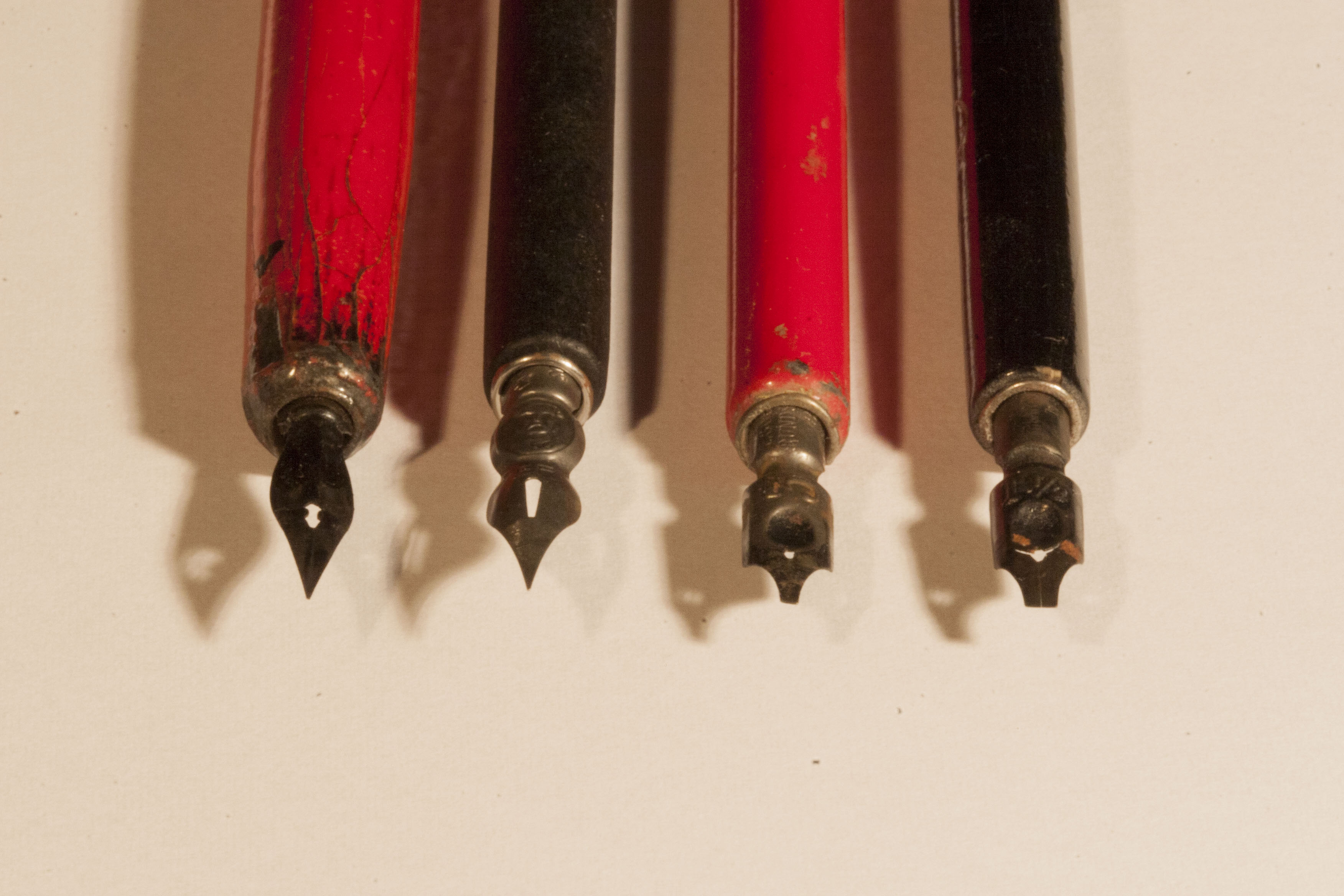
Dip pen nibs

== See also ==
- Birmingham pen trade
- Quill
- Calligraphy
- Lettering
- Nib (pen)
