= Kaweco =

Pen manufacturing company

- Type: PLC (1921–30); Brand (1889–1921, 1930–present)
- Industry: Writing implements
- Founded: 1889; 137 years ago in Heidelberg
- Founder: Heilderger Pen Factory
- Defunct: 1930 (PL company)
- Fate: Company defunct; brand and stock acquired by KWC in 1930.
- Headquarters: Nuremberg, Germany
- Products: Fountain, rollerball, digital and dip pens, mechanical pencils
- Owner: Gutberlet Cosmetics (1994–present)
- Website: kaweco-pen.com

Kaweco is a German brand of writing implements, originally introduced by the Heidelberg Pen Company for its dip pens line in 1889. Kaweco became a public limited company in 1921, then being taken over by the Knust Woringen and Grube company (KWG), after Kaweco went bankrupt in 1930.

In 1994, Gutberlet GmbH, a cosmetics company based in Nuremberg, acquired the rights to the "Kaweco" name. The core business is the production and distribution of writing instruments and accessories.

Current products under the Kaweco brand include fountain, rollerball, digital and dip pens, and mechanical pencils.

The German brand Kaweco is often confused with the Dutch brand Kaweco (Kamps, de Wild en Co.), which is a manufacturer of agricultural machinery.

== History ==
The Kaweco brand originated in 1883, when the "Heidelberger Federhalter Fabrik" ("Heidelberg Dip Pen Factory") was founded by Luce and Enßlen in Heidelberg. Wooden dip pens and fountain pens were produced, with gold nibs manufactured by A. Morton & Co. imported from New York.

Heinrich Koch and Rudolph Weber took over the dip pen factory in 1889 and set-up a new production facility in Handschuhsheim, near Heidelberg. The products were marked with the brand names Perkeo, Omega, and Kaweco and were stamped with the initials HF, which stands for Heidelberger Federhalterfabrik (Heidelberg dip pen factory).

Shortly after, the brand name Kaweco became the company name under which the products are still distributed today.

In 1909, the first Kaweco safety fountain pen was produced. Due to demand, the distribution of Kaweco writing instruments expanded.

Kaweco opened subsidiaries in Berlin, Paris, Zurich and Vienna, and established representatives in other countries. A 1911 catalog shows a wide range of fountain pens and filling systems, and first mentions pocket fountain pens for ladies, officers, and sportsmen. 1911 was also the introductory year of the Kaweco Sport.

In 1914 Kaweco assumed control over the former parts provider A. Morton & Co., which at the time was the oldest gold nib factory in New York. These assets and equipment were moved to Heidelberg and Kaweco began producing its own gold nibs .

In 1921 Kaweco was reorganized as a PLC (public limited company). Kaweco had an approximate annual production of 130,000 fountain pens and employed 600 people. Lever fountain pens were added to production.

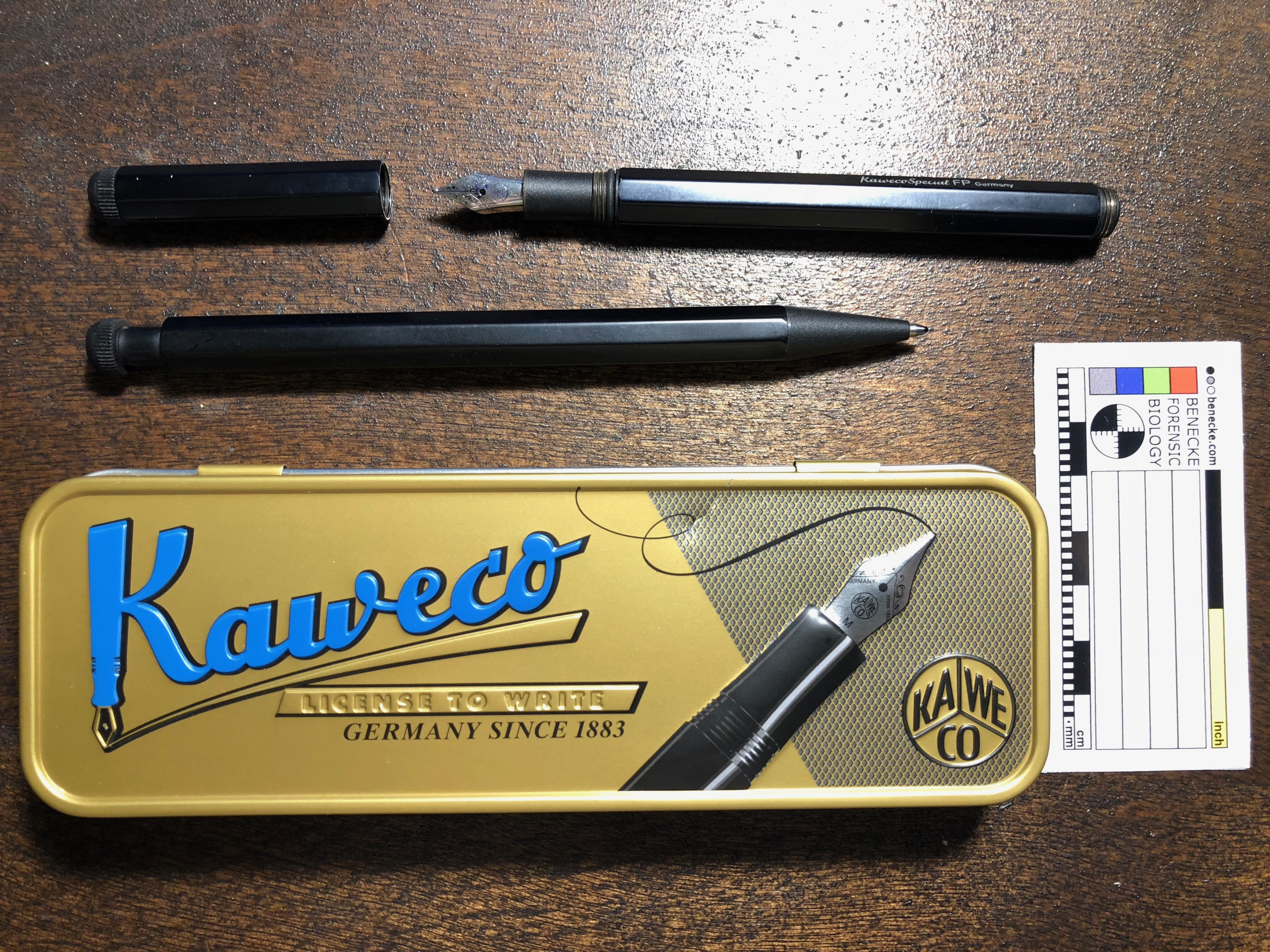
Kaweco fountain, ballpens, and tin

In 1929 fountain pen factory Knust, Woringen & Grube from Wiesloch (Aurumia brand) purchased the Kaweco company name, machines, stock, and patents. Friedrich Grube would lead the company for the next 30 years. In this year the "KA WE CO" Logo, which is divided into three parts, was developed. This logo is still used today and can be found as a branding on many different products.

During World War II, a lack of raw materials and manpower nearly led to a complete production shut down. On 30 October 1945, several months after the end of the war, the county commissioner gave permission for Kaweco to resume business.

On 5 May 1960, Friedrich Grube Sr. died at the age of 63. His son Wilhelm took over the company. Under Wilhelm Grube's leadership the design of the product range was updated to look slimmer.

In 1971, Kaweco launched the Sport set, which included a special jewellery pendant, as a licensed writing instrument of the 20th Olympic Games in Munich. Large companies valued the Kaweco Sport as a promotional item.

In 1994, cosmetics company Gutberlet GmbH, based in Nuremberg, registered the rights to the Kaweco name and brand. A new Sport series, inspired by the design of 1935, was launched. Pocket writing instruments were introduced to the market as fountain pens, rollerball pens, ball pens, mechanical pencils and clutch pencils.

The company Diplomat became the worldwide exclusive sales partner with Kaweco, however in 1999 Diplomat was taken over by Herlitz, ending this partnership. Since then, Kaweco has been increasing its worldwide distribution independently, working closely with domestic partners. Today Kaweco products are available in more than 50 countries.

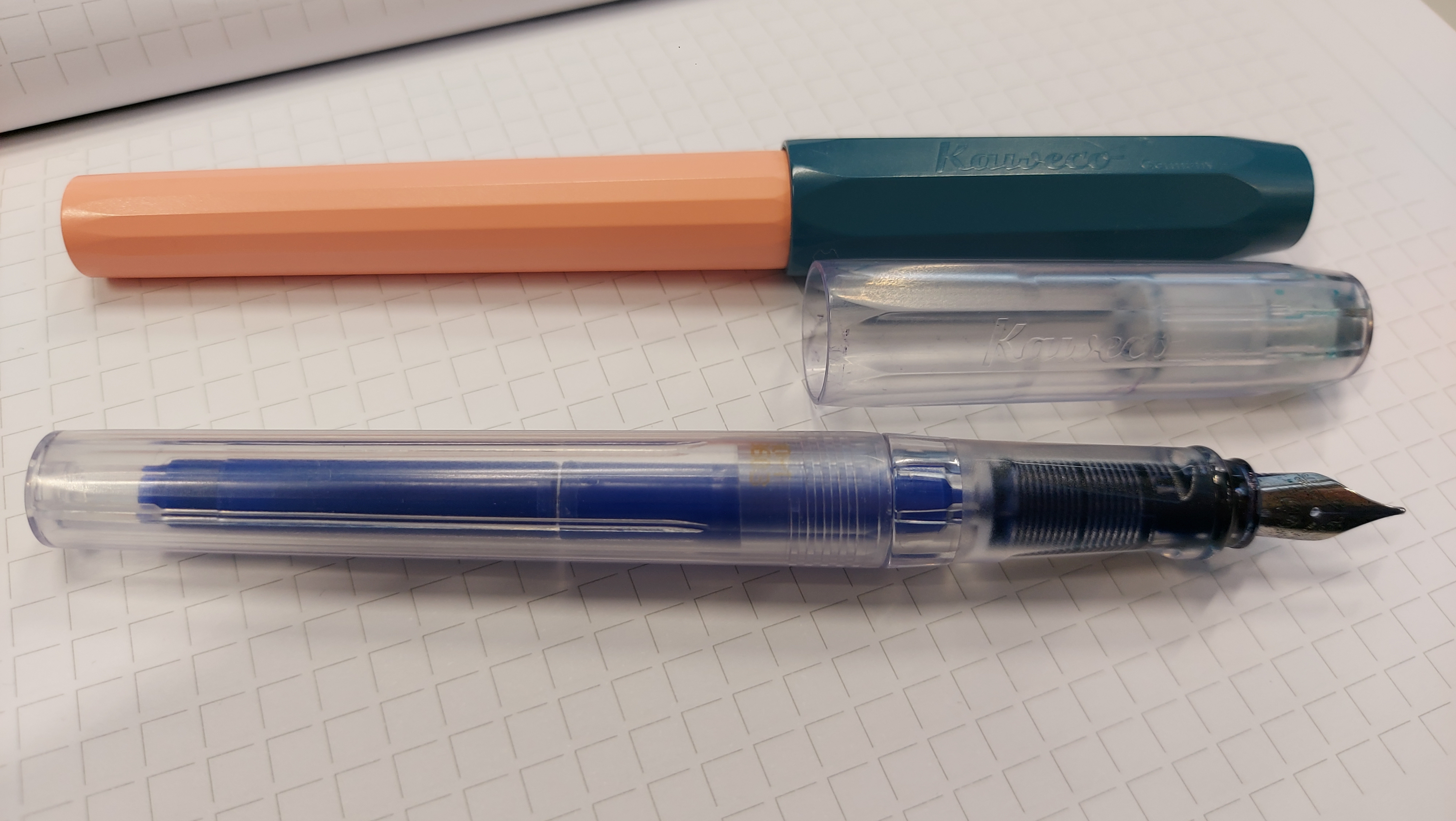
Kaweco Perkeo simple fountain pens for school, medium nib

== Company ==
The brand's retro design of its products are combined with more modern technology.

Besides the core business, Kaweco markets several co-brandings. Individual pen designs are created in cooperation with partners such as Microsoft, NOMOS Glashütte, Oris., and others.

== In popular culture ==
In Bergman Island (2021), the character of Chris (Vicky Krieps) is shown using a Kaweco Sport pen.

== Bibliography ==
- Timo Teufert: Der Federhalter schrieb in Heidelberg Geschichte. In: Rhein-Neckar-Zeitung. 16 December 2008.
- Andreas Lambrou, Stefan Wallrafen: Füllfederhalter - Ein Überblick über die Entstehungsgeschichte und die wichtigsten internationalen Marken. Heyne-Verlag, München 1992, ISBN 3-453-05442-3.
- Gerhard Brandl, Michael Gutberlet: Kaweco - Gutberlet crossing Kaweco. verlag Regionalkultur, Ubstadt-Weiher, 2017.
- Andreas Lambrou: Fountain Pens of the world. Classic Pens Ltd., Epping, 1995.
- Andreas Lambrou: Fountain Pens - Vintage and modern. Classic Pens Ltd., Epping, 1989. ISBN 978-0-85667-362-7.
- Michael Gutberlet: Kaweco: ein Stück Geschichte aus der (Schreibgeräte-) Industrie - Sonderanfertigungen 1924–1928. Nürnberg, 2016.
- Thomas Neureither: Seit 100 Jahren - Füllhalter aus Handschuhsheim. Heidelberg, 1997.
