= Quill =

Writing instrument made from a feather

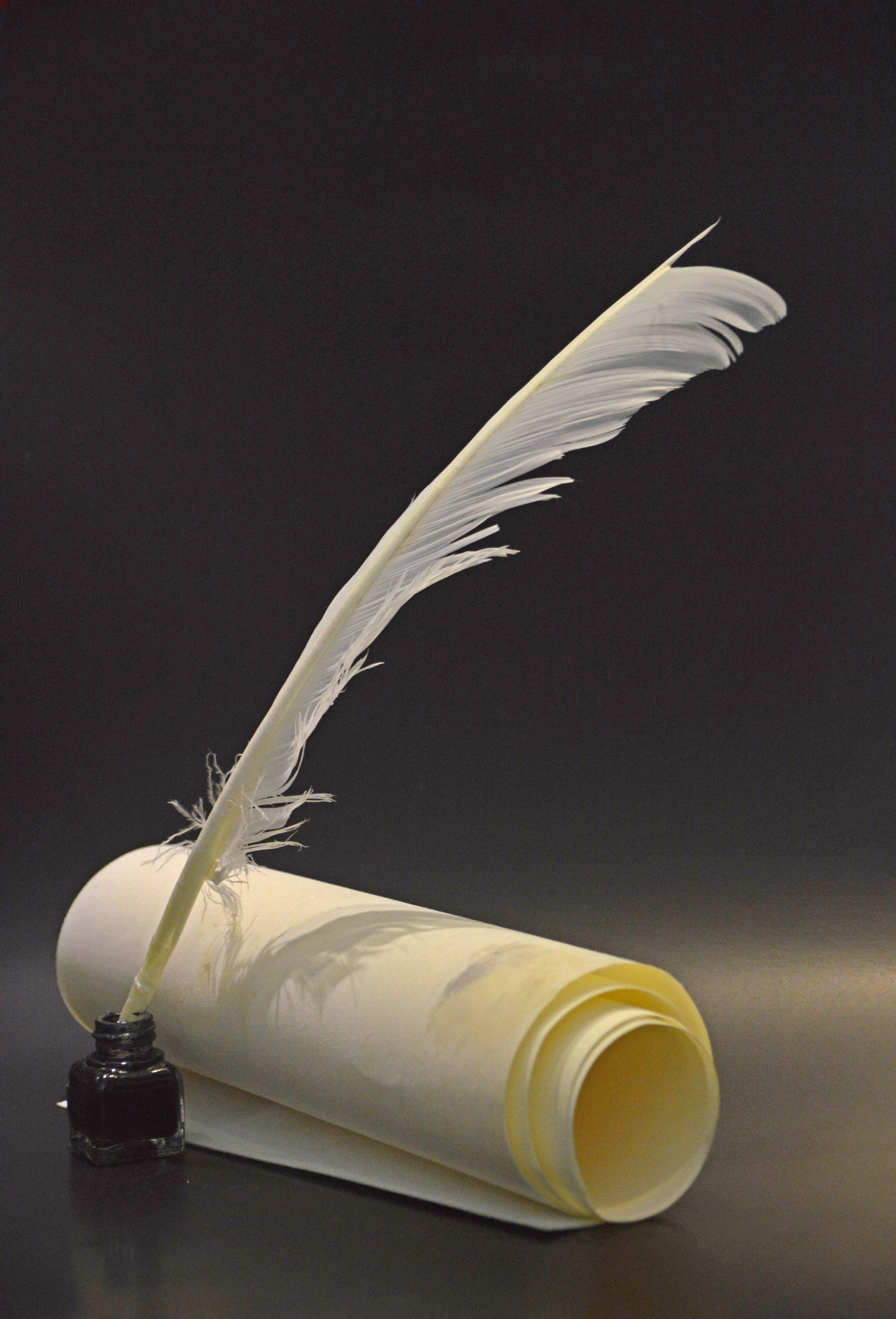
Quill and a parchment

A quill is a writing tool made from a moulted flight feather of a large bird. Quills were used for writing with ink before the invention of the dip pen, the fountain pen, and the ballpoint pen.

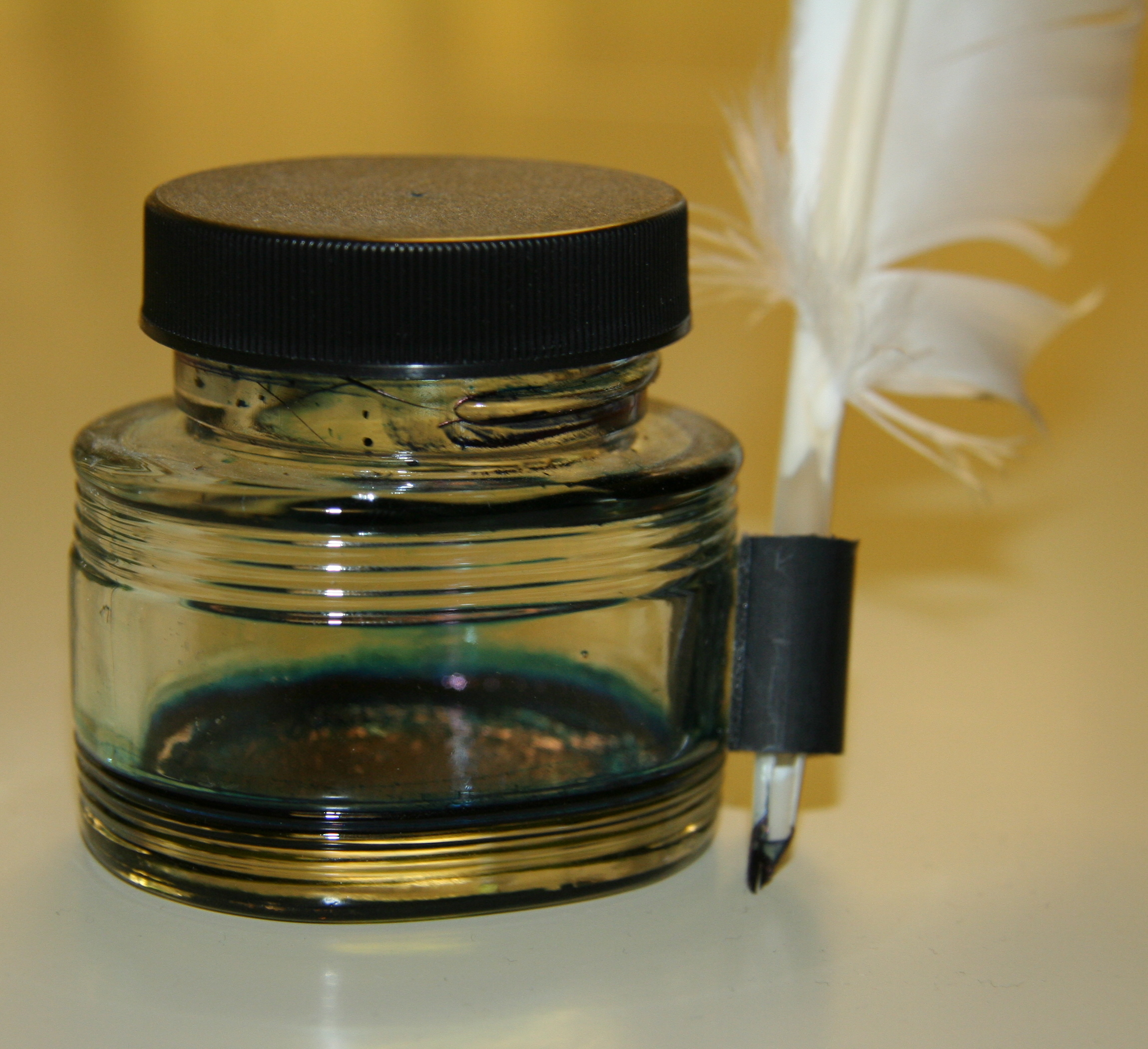
Ink bottle and quill

As with many antiquated writing instruments, quills have no internal ink reservoir and therefore need to be dipped into an inkwell periodically during writing. Quills are rarely used by modern calligraphers; however, they are still the tool of choice for historical reenactors or select writers, as the ability to cut the quill allows for a greater freedom of calligraphic scripts.

== History ==
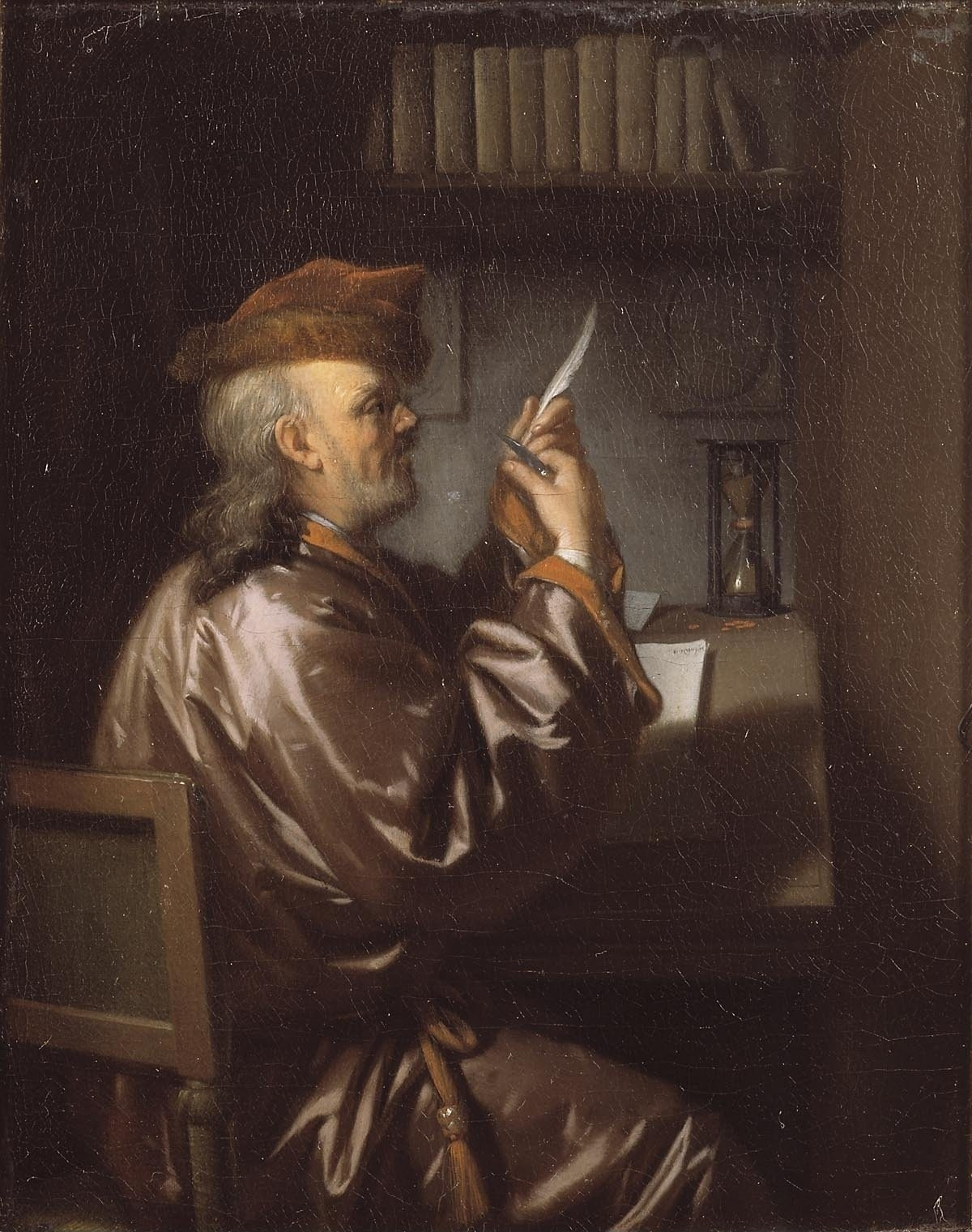
The Bookkeeper by Philip van Dijk, showing a bookkeeper sharpening a quill

The Egyptian reed pen had been in use since antiquity, being used across the ancient world until the fall of Rome. Quills were the primary writing instrument in the barbarian kingdoms in the 6th century. The best quills were usually made from goose, swan, and later turkey feathers. Greece and Islamic world used reed pens for much of history, with quills not commonly used as writing instruments.

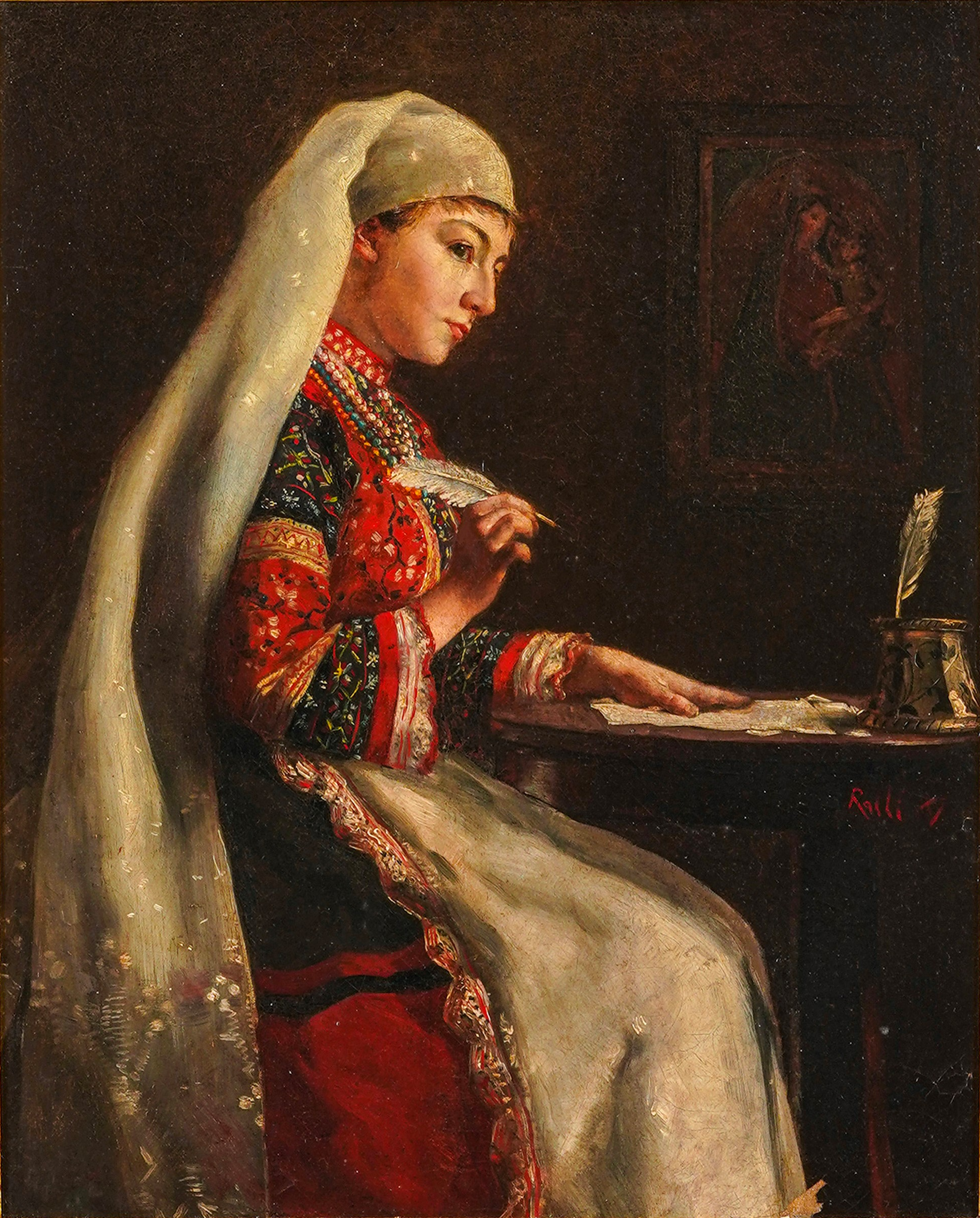
La Lettera by Théodore Jacques Ralli, c. 1887, with a woman writing letter with quill pen.

Quill pens were the instrument of choice in medieval Europe due to their compatibility with parchment and vellum. Before this, the large reed pen had been used, but smaller letters were able to be achieved using a quill. Other than written text, quills were often used to create figures, decorations, and illustrations on manuscripts, although many illuminators and painters preferred fine brushes for their work.

The shapable and flexible nib allowed for a variety of different strokes, spawning a wide array of calligraphic scripts throughout history.

Quills went into decline after the invention of the steel dip pen in Great Britain in the early 1800s

While quills are rarely used as writing instruments in the modern day, they are still being produced as specialty items, mostly for hobbyists. Such quills tend to have metal nibs or are sometimes outfitted with a ballpoint pen inside to remove the need for a separate source of ink.

Twenty goose-quill pens are placed at the four counsel tables each day the U.S. Supreme Court is in session; "most lawyers appear before the Court only once, and gladly take the quills home as souvenirs." This has been done since the earliest sessions of the Court.

In the Jewish tradition quill pens, called kulmus (קולמוס), are still used by scribes to write Torah scrolls, Mezuzot, and Tefillin.

== Description ==
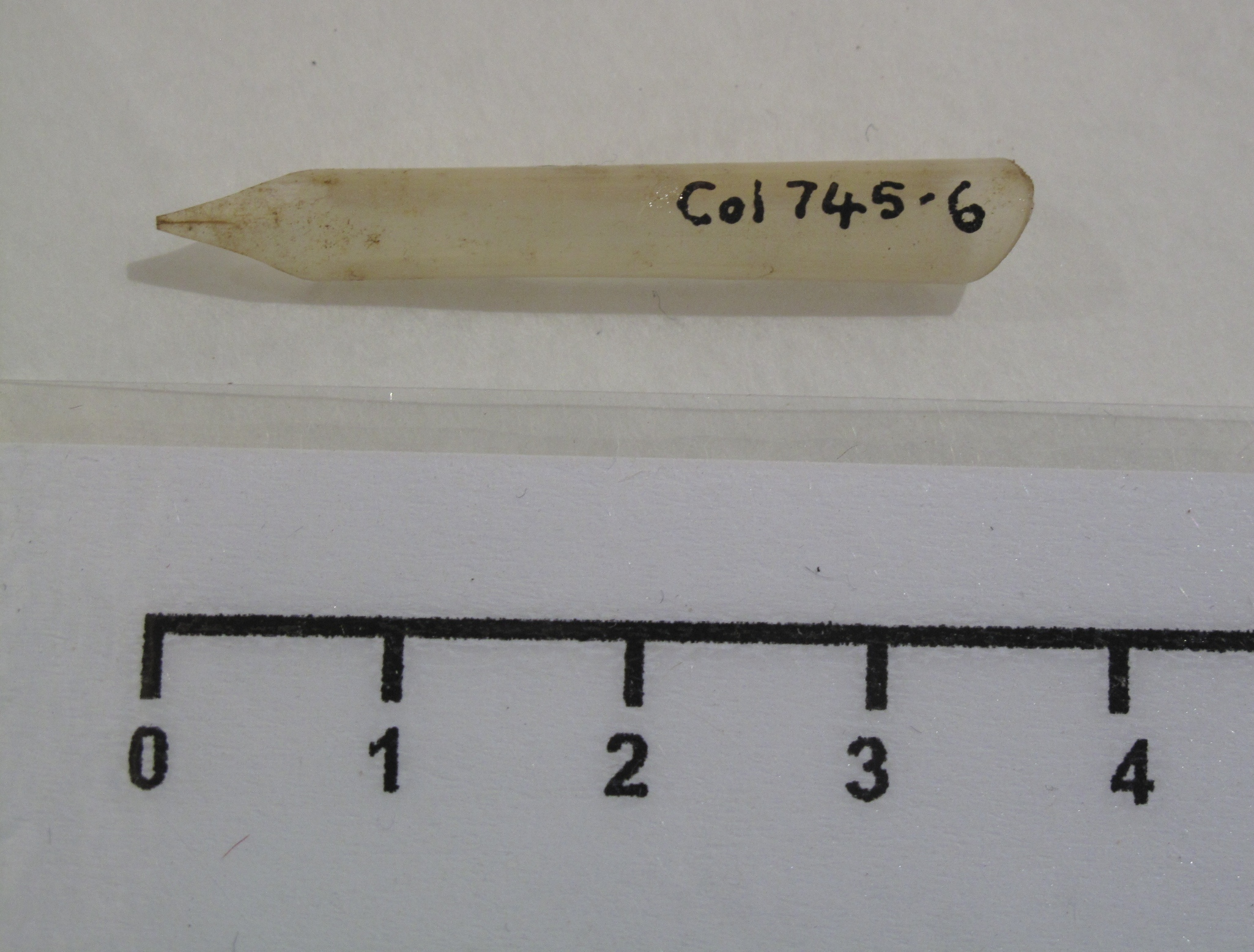
A nib cut from a bird's quill

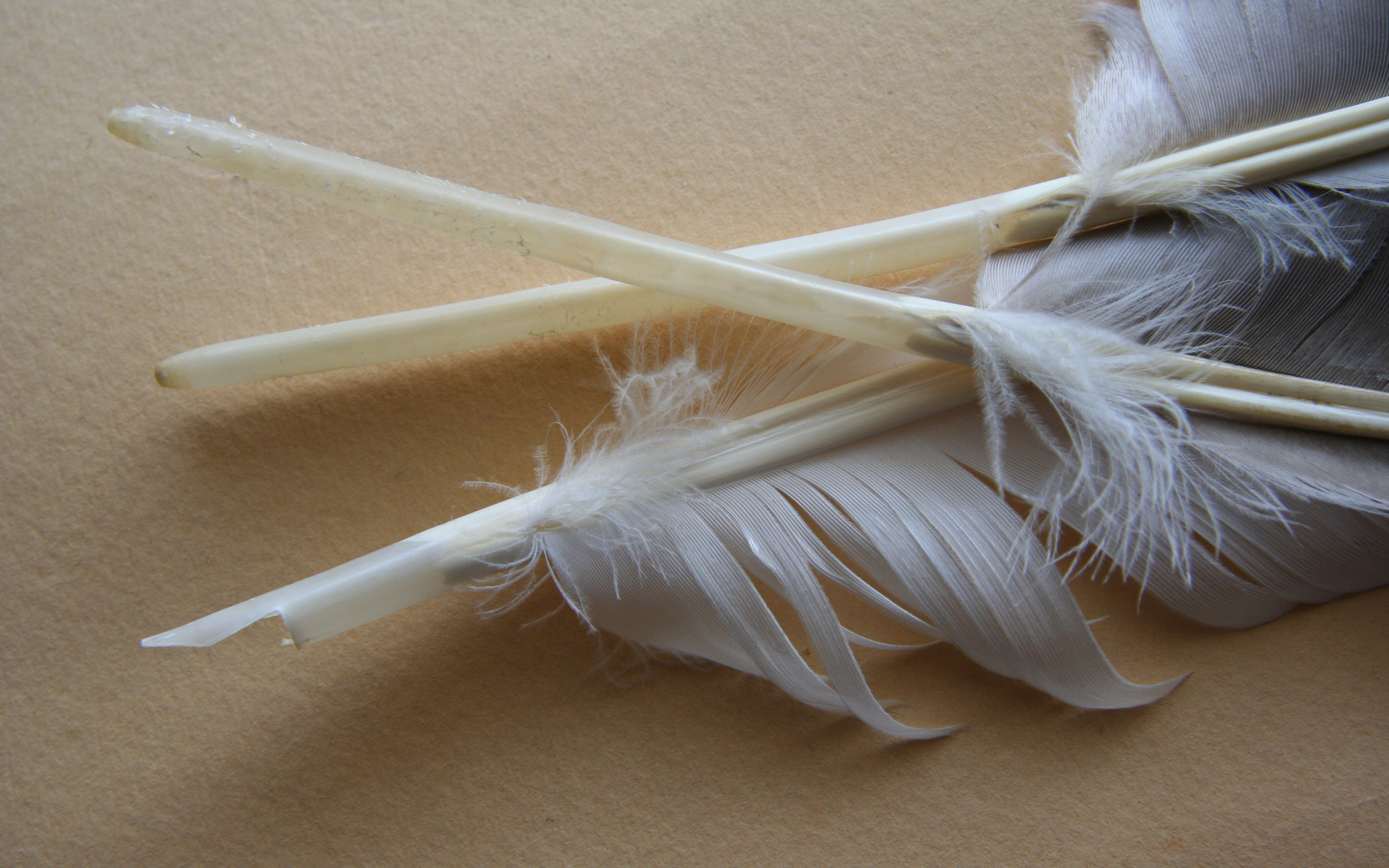
Feathers in stages of being made into quills

The shaft of a flight feather is long and hollow, making it suitable to be crafted into a pen. The strongest quills come from the first flight feathers discarded by birds during their annual moult. Quills are denominated from the order in which they are fixed on the wing, with the first flight feather being the most preferable. Feathers beyond the sixth flight feather on the wing are not suitable for writing. Although some have claim that feathers from the left wing are better suited for right-handed writers and feathers from the right wing are better suited to left-handed writers due to the feather curving away from the sight line, quills are usually cut to six to eight inches in length so no such consideration of curvature or sight-line is necessary.

Goose feathers were most commonly used for regular writing, while scarcer, more expensive swan feathers were used for larger lettering. Depending on availability and strength of the feather, as well as quality and characteristic of the line wanted by the writer, other bird feathers used for quill making include but are not limited to those from the crow, eagle, owl, turkey, and hawk. Crow quills were particularly useful when writing small, such as accounting, was required. Each bird could supply only about 10 to 12 good-quality quills.

The process of making a quill from a feather involves curing the shaft, typically by air drying, taking several months, a year, or over a year. Later methods used hot sand or ashes to harden it, taking only a few minutes. Then fashioning the feather into a nib using a pen knife or other sharp cutting tool.

On a quill, the barbs should be stripped off completely (the pinion for example only has significant barbs on one side of the barrel.) Later, a fashion developed for stripping partially on one side or leaving a decorative tuft of at the top. The fully plumed quill is mostly a later Romantic and Victorian invention and was not common in history. Most manuscript illustrations of scribes show a quill devoid of decorative barbs or at least partially stripped.

The hollow shaft of the feather, known as the calamus, acts as an ink reservoir and ink flows to the tip through the slit by capillary action. British calligrapher Edward Johnston, in 1906, recommended inserting a thin metal strip, curved to form a spring, into the shaft to better retain the ink, especially if writing on a flat surface. Johnston also advised using a vertically angled writing slope so that the quill could be held horizontally to better retain ink.

In a well prepared quill, the nib should not split apart or warp through wetting with ink and drying and should retain its shape adequately, requiring only infrequent sharpening.

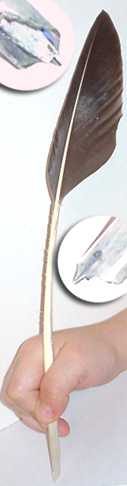
Quill with stripped barbs and insets of tips

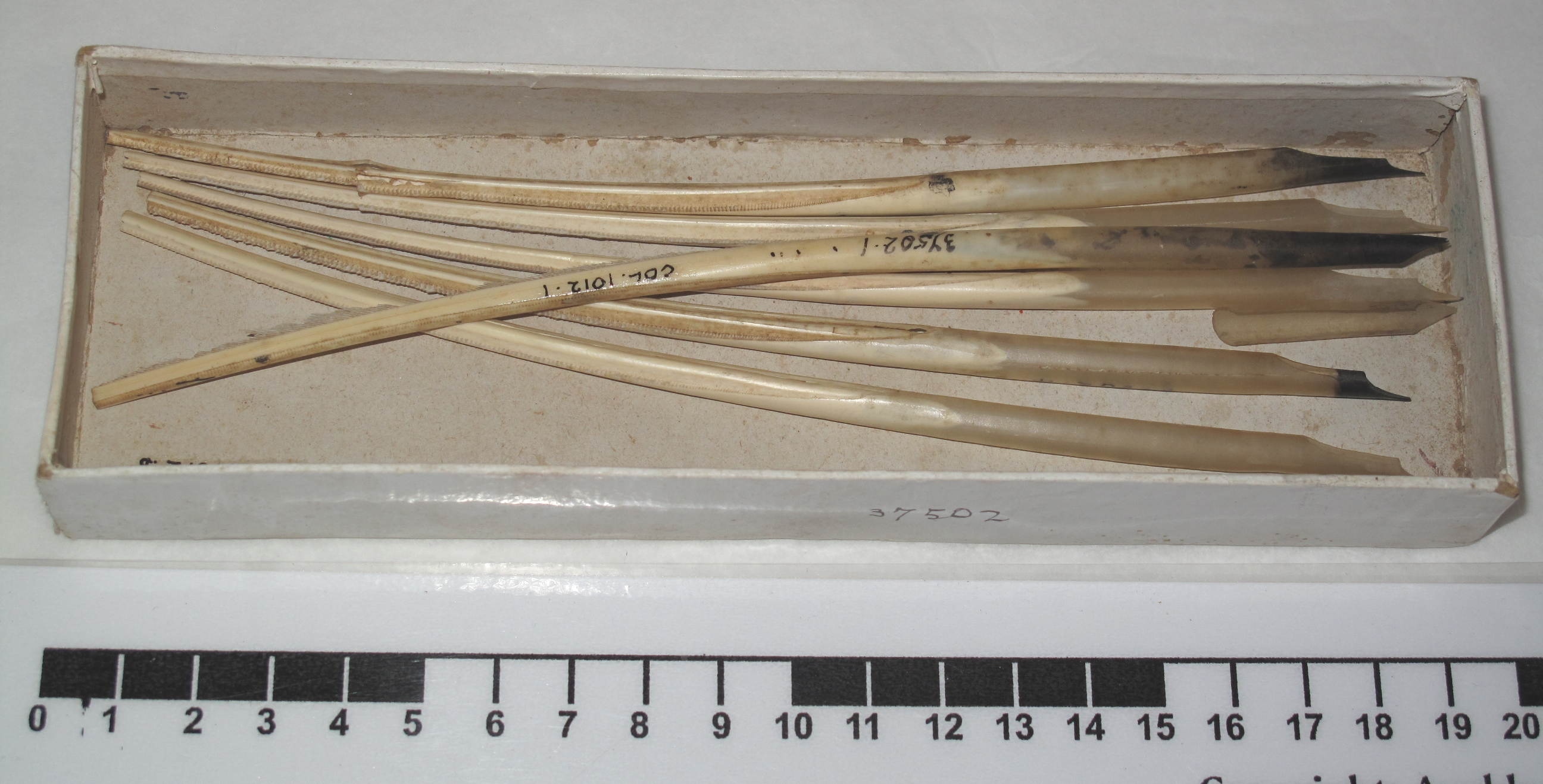
Box of quills with barbs removed

== Use ==
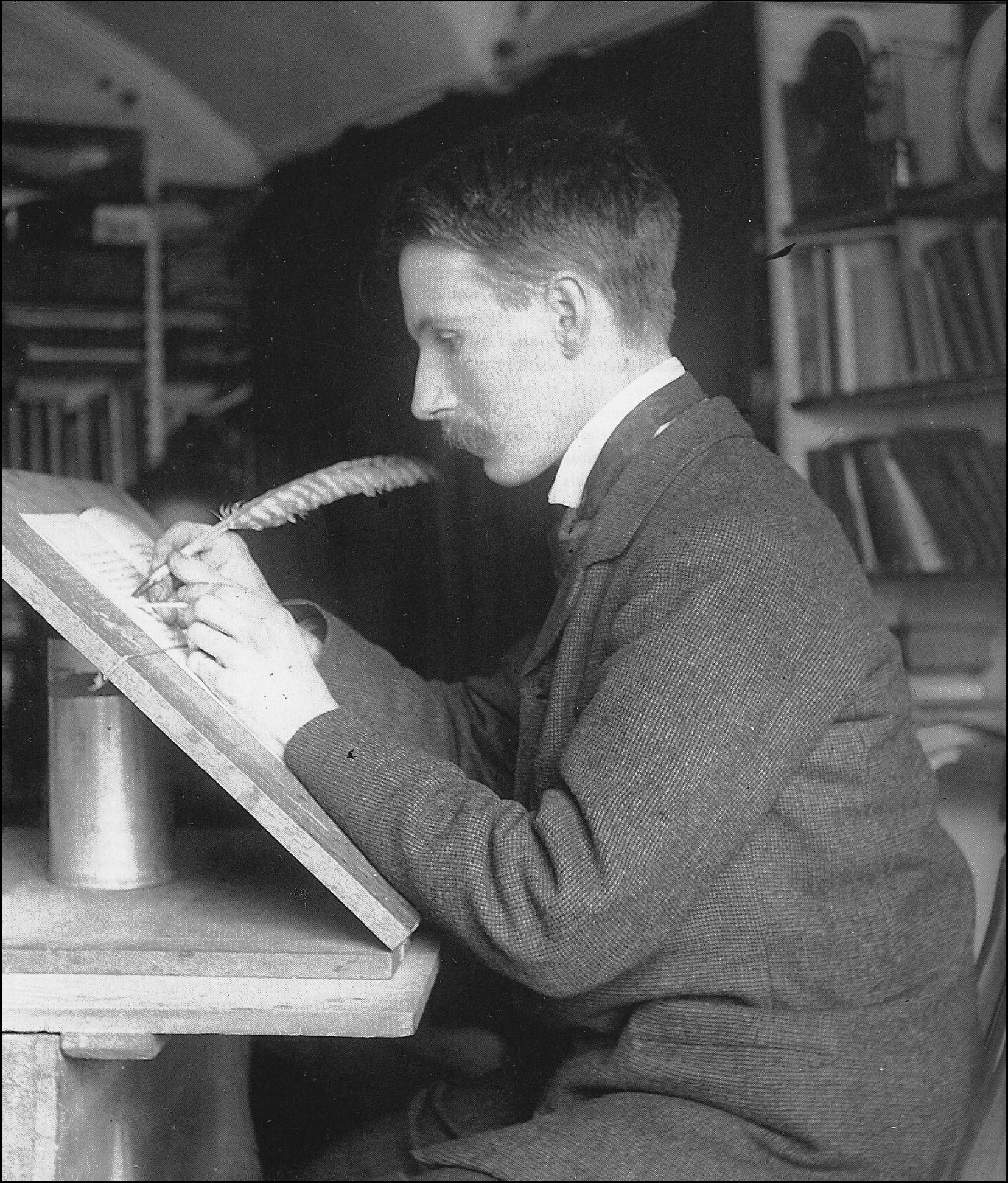
British calligrapher Edward Johnston writing with a quill pen

Quill pens were used to write the vast majority of historical manuscripts. Quill pens were used to write Magna Carta and the Declaration of Independence. U.S. President Thomas Jefferson specifically bred geese at Monticello to supply his need for quills. Quill pens are still used today mainly by professional scribes, calligraphers, and historical reenactors.

== Symbolism ==
The coat of arms of Mynämäki in Finland

Quills have long been associated with administration and writing.

From the 19th century in radical and socialist symbolism, quills have been used to symbolize clerks and intelligentsia. Some notable examples are the Radical Civic Union, the Czech National Social Party in combination with the hammer, symbol of the labour movement, or the Democratic Party of Socialists of Montenegro.

Quills appear on the seals of the United States Census Bureau and the Administrative Office of the United States Courts. They also appear in the coats of arms of several US Army Adjutant general units which focus on administrative duties.

== See also ==
- Porcupines, which have similar anatomical structures also known as quills
- Spine (zoology)
