= Esterbrook =

American pen manufacturer

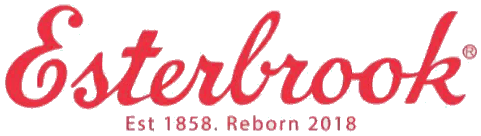

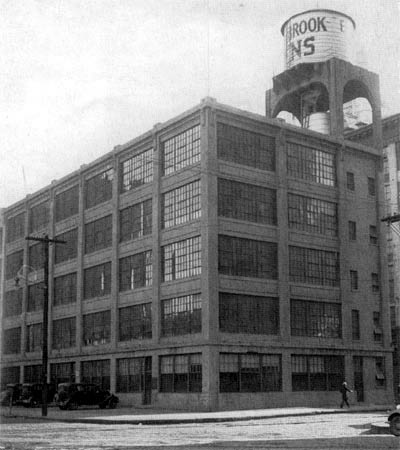
- The Esterbrook Pens Co. plant stood at Cooper Street and Delaware Avenue in Camden, New Jersey, c. 1920
- Formerly: United States Steel Pen Manufacturing Company; Esterbrook Steel Pen Manufacturing Company; The Esterbrook Pen Company
- Type: Private (1858–1971); Brand (2014–present)
- Industry: Writing instruments
- Founded: 1858
- Founder: Richard Esterbrook
- Defunct: 1971; 55 years ago
- Fate: Company defunct; brand revived in 2014
- Headquarters: Camden, New Jersey, United States
- Area served: Worldwide
- Products: Former: Dip pens and holders; Current: Fountain pens and bags
- Owner: Harpen Brand Holdings, LLC (2014–18); Kenro Industries (2018–present)
- Website: esterbrookpens.com

The Esterbrook Pen Company is a former American manufacturing company founded by Cornish immigrant Richard Esterbrook and based in Camden, New Jersey. It was the largest pen manufacturer in the United States, having reached a record of producing 216,000,000 pens a year. The company produced dip pens, then concentrating on fountain pens until it was acquired by Venus Pencils in 1967, ceasing activities in 1971.

In 2014, Harpen Brand Holdings, LLC, acquired the rights to the "Esterbrook" brand name, releasing a series of pens. Four years later, the brand was purchased by Kenro Industries, which is its current owner and holder.

== History ==
=== The beginning ===
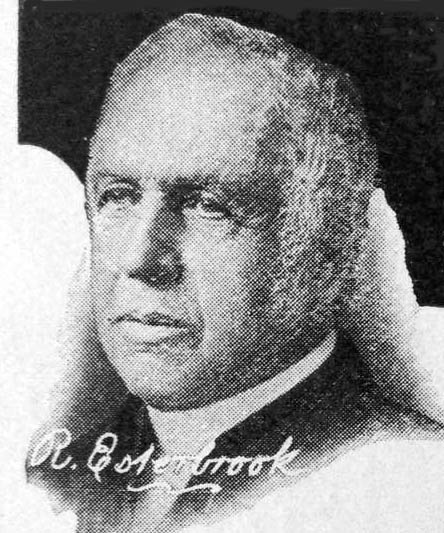
Richard Esterbrook, founder

Richard Esterbrook (1812-1895) was a Cornish Quaker from England who saw an opportunity in the United States to manufacture steel pens. In 1856 he traveled to the US to set up shop as "The Steel Pen Manufacturing Company". In 1858 he was able to establish himself as the sole pen manufacturer in the US and changed the company name to "The Esterbrook Steel Pen Mfg. Co.", with just 15 employees in Camden, New Jersey. At the time, two of the four pen companies located in the United States were situated in Camden. Besides Esterbrook, the first in the country, the C. Howard Hunt Pen Company at 7th and State streets produced pens, pencil sharpeners and allied products and employed 125 workers. At its height, the Esterbrook plant had 450 workers and produced 600,000 pens a day.

There were no experienced pen-manufacturing workers in the U.S. and no broadly available machinery to produce the pens, so Esterbrook designed all processes in-house. Only 15 people made up the first payroll, but the growth of the company was steady. The buildings were added to from time to time, and in 1912 a five-story concrete building was erected that nearly doubled the size of the plant. Machines gradually replaced hand work and greatly increased output.

=== Development ===
Quality was a key factor in his success. Esterbrook's steel pens were versatile, long lasting, and came in many different styles to fit the varied writing styles of the public. Richard Esterbrook did not see the "empire" his company was to become as he died in Atlanta on October 12, 1895.

Just one year after his death, in 1896 the company started an Esterbrook branch in England to join the ranks of the other main pen manufactures in Birmingham. By 1920, the fountain pen was fast becoming more popular amongst people who were tired of dipping pens into ink, and the company manufactured its first fountain pen. By 1930 the company sought less expensive means of manufacturing pens, as gold and jewel tips were growing too expensive and in this same year they began selling fountain pens in England. The Esterbrook Company began using the metal Iridium, which they called "Durachrome", in their nibs. To meet the fountain pen demand the company reformed as "The Esterbrook Hazel Pens Ltd". In 1940 war had come to strike a blow at the Esterbrook company.

=== Decline ===
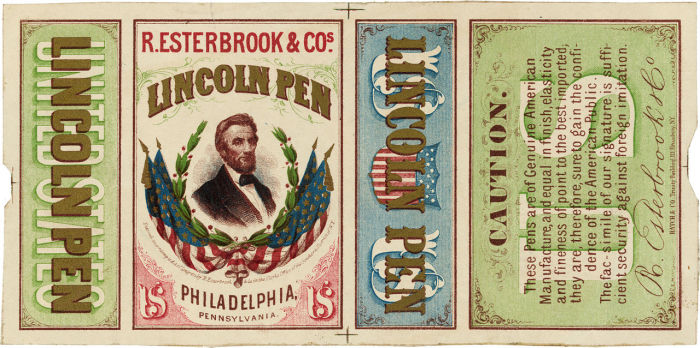
The "Lincoln Pen", packaging, 1866

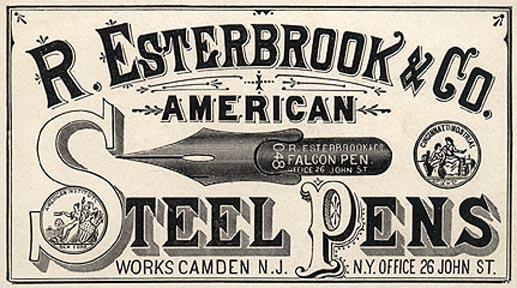
1866 card featuring the 066 "Falcon Pen"

In 1947 Esterbrook bought out John Mitchell (which had been established in 1822 as the world's first manufacturer to cut nibs by machine) and then acquired Hazell Pen Co. The company re-formed again as "The Esterbrook Pen Company". Some time after that, Esterbrook ceased production of dip pen nibs permanently.

The post war years had seen a decline particularly in the export trade to the traditional markets of the British Empire. As those countries gained independence due to American aid, they had more dollars to spend in the United States than pounds in the United Kingdom.

Esterbrook continued to thrive until the beginning of 1960 when it started to see a decline in export trades with England. In 1967 the Esterbrook Empire was bought out by the Venus Pencil Company and thus the name changed to "Venus Esterbrook", which continued to produce replacement nibs for fountain pens. There were numerous administrative changes and moves and eventually their final base of operations was vacated in 1971, and the building was demolished.

Venus Esterbrook would be finally taken over by Berol in 1971, and all Esterbrook operations ceased.

=== Revival ===
In 2014, Harpen Brand Holdings, LLC, acquired the rights to the "Esterbrook" brand name, registering it as "Esterbrook, est. 1858" (plus the phrase "America's Original Pen Company") and releasing a series of Esterbrook fountain and ballpoint pens, including new versions of classic Esterbrook models, such as the "Deluxe" fountain pen and the "J" ballpoint pen, both originally released in the 1950s.

The brand was later acquired by Kenro Industries, Inc. Since then, Kenro has manufactured and commercialised the Esterbrook products.

== Models ==
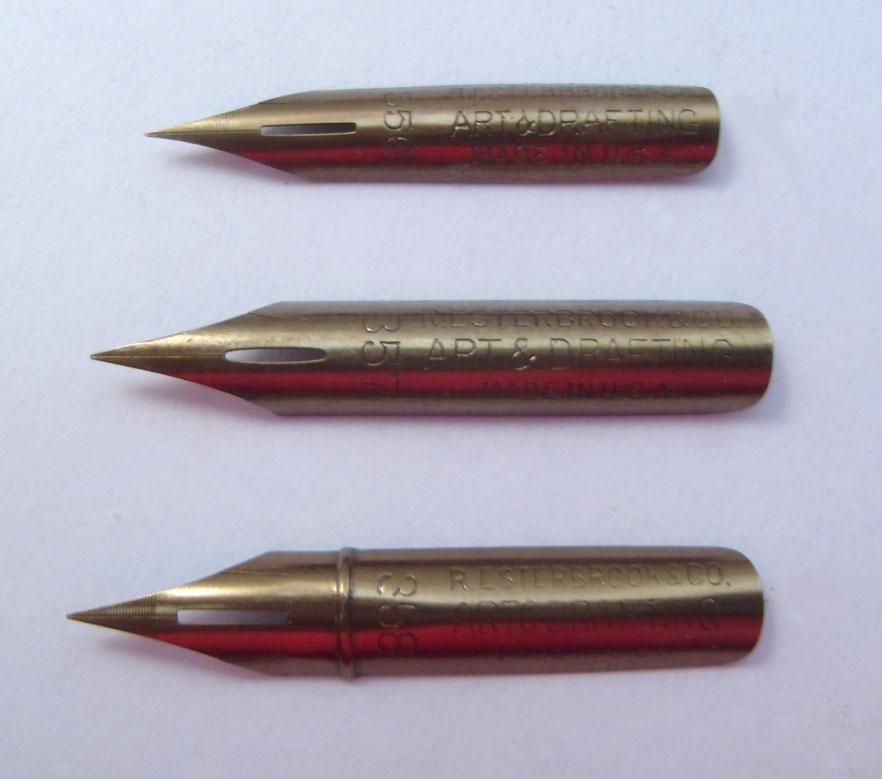
Esterbrook's 356, 357 and 358 art & drafting pens

Esterbrook Crane Mariner pens at Makoba pen store, Bengaluru (2026)

Esterbrook produced a wide range of dip pens for art and calligraphy. Some of them were #62, 355, 356, 357, 358 (extra fine pens suitable for drawings); #0 (lettering), #048 "Falcon", #32 "American Congress", #14 "Bank Pen", among many others.

Fountain pen past models include the "Relief", "Dollar", "J", "Safari" series, among others. As of November 2019, current Esterbrook model lines are the following:

- "Camden": Named for the city where Richard Esterbrook settled his company.
- "Estie": Vintage models with several texture patterns on their bodies.
- "Phaeton": Vintage model inspired on the homonymous pen originally released in 1964.
- "Popeye": Decorated with some Popeye the Sailor images).

== Prominent users ==
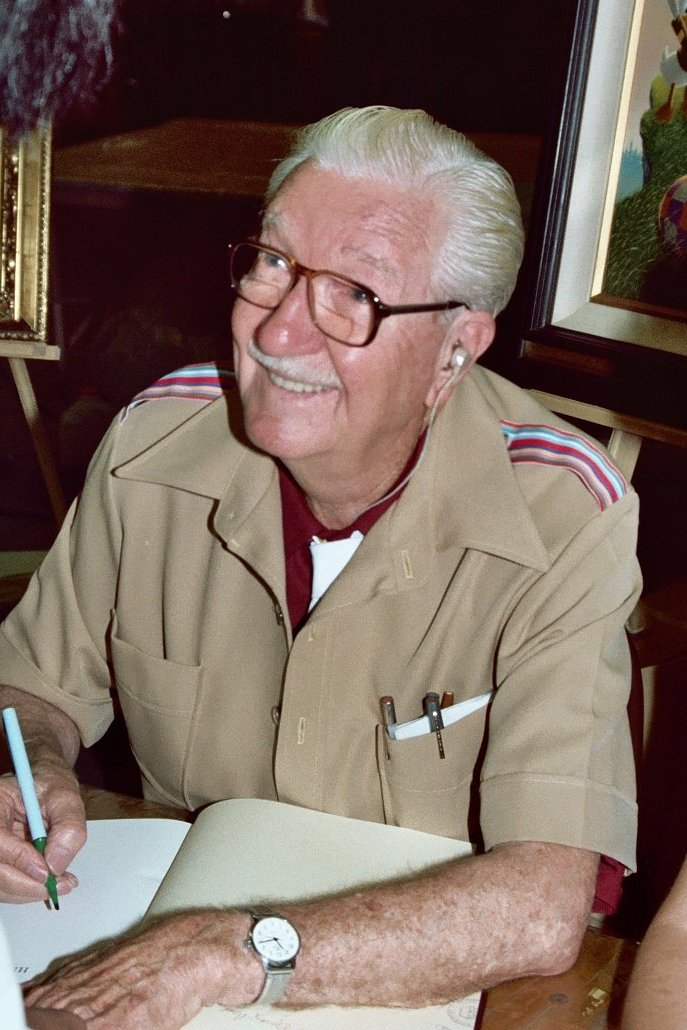
Disney artist Carl Barks was an Esterbrook enthusiast

Esterbrook pens were among those used by Presidents John F. Kennedy and Lyndon B. Johnson to sign legislation. A set of 72 clear Lucite Esterbrook fountain pens were used to sign the civil rights bill into law in 1964.

The famous Disney artist Carl Barks was an enthusiastic user of Esterbrook pens. He particularly used a Nº 356 model to ink and letter his famous Donald Duck comic-book pages.

I drew direct onto the drawing paper with a Scripto light blue pencil, and inked with a 356 Esterbrook pen. My wife inked the dialogue with an A-5 or B-6 Speedball, and blacked the solid areas with a #2 sable brush.

— Carl Barks (Letter to Michael Barrier, January 14, 1967)

I used a #356 Esterbrook art and drafting pen which could do everything from thin 'fadeaways' to broad accented curve sweeps on foreground circles such as the ducks' forms. The trick of breaking in a new pen, I discovered, is to soak it for several minutes in the ink bottle. Then wipe off the ink and the pen's varnish. For some weird reason most new pens then start out flexible and free-flowing.

— Carl Barks (Letter to Scott Matheson, March 21, 1973)

Peanuts creator Charles M. Schulz used an Esterbrook 914 Radio nib for inking the comic strip. He liked the nib so much, he bought the remaining stock when Esterbrook went out of business.

Author Shelby Foote used Esterbrook 313 Probate Nibs to write all three volumes of The Civil War: A Narrative.
