= Venus Pencils =

Brand name of pencils

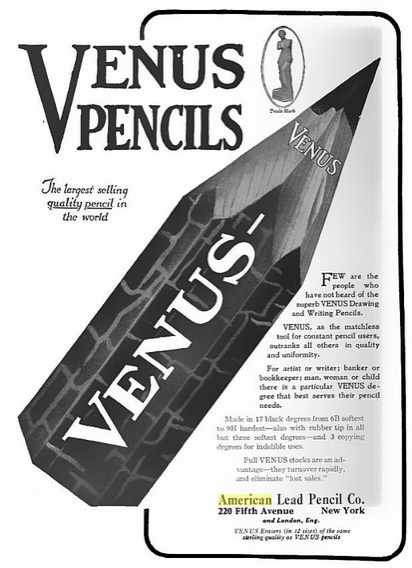
Venus Pencils

Venus Pencils were a brand name of pencils made by the American Lead Pencil Company beginning in 1905. The production of Venus pencils gave the company an early start in the manufacture of high-quality pencils marketed to artists and architects. Venus pencils became even more popular after the First World War, which had interrupted the supply of pencils from German companies. In schools many people who used Venus brand pencils saw their slogan "Venus Beats All", which oddly was a reference to the ancient Roman dice game in which the "Venus Roll" was the best possible roll.

== Varieties ==
Venus Pencils were produced in a total of seventeen degrees under the categories of very soft, soft, medium, hard, and very hard. They were made with no eraser, a tip and eraser, or an oversized tip and eraser.

== Name changes ==
In 1956, the American Lead Pencil Company officially changed its name to the Venus Pen and Pencil Corporation. A number of acquisitions followed, and in 1967, the company name was changed to Venus-Esterbrook. In 1973, the company was acquired by Faber-Castell.

== See also ==
- Esterbrook
