= Sattur =

- Town
- Sattur, Tamil Nadu
- Coordinates: 9.358000°N 77.915600°E
- Country: India
- State: Tamil Nadu
- Region: Madurai
- District: Virudhunagar

Government
  - Type: Second Grade Municipality
  - Body: Sattur Municipality

Area
  - Total: 3 km^{2} (1.2 sq mi)
- Elevation: 91 m (299 ft)

Population (2011)
  - Total: 29,398
  - Density: 413/km^{2} (1,070/sq mi)

Languages
  - Official: Tamil
- Time zone: UTC+5:30 (IST)
- PIN: 626 203
- Telephone code: 91-4562
- Vehicle registration: TN 67
- Website: www.sattur.info

Sattur or Saathur (Tamil: [saːttuːɾ]) is a Town in Virudhunagar district in the Indian state of Tamil Nadu. As of 2011, the town had a population of 29,398.

The town is located in the bank of Vaippar river. Sattur/Saathur taluk has contents of black soil around the town, suitable for crop cultivation. The town lies in NH 44 and has very good road and railway connectivity.

== Geography ==
Sattur is located at 9.358000°N 77.915600°E. It has an average elevation of 91 metres (299 feet). Sattur is located between two rivers Vaippar and Uppodai. Sattur has good amenities such as banks, railway stations, bus stands and ATMs .

== Demographics ==
Religious census
Religion	Percent(%)
Hindu	91.3%
Muslim	3.45%
Christian	5.13%
Sikh	0.01%
Jain	0.02%
Other	0.09%

According to 2011 census, Sattur had a population of 29,398 with a sex-ratio of 1,042 females for every 1,000 males, much above the national average of 929. A total of 2,691 were under the age of six, constituting 1,407 males and 1,284 females. Scheduled Castes and Scheduled Tribes accounted for 7.68% and 0.81% of the population respectively. The average literacy of the town was 78.85%, compared to the national average of 72.99%. The town had a total of : 8093 households. There were a total of 13,065 workers, comprising 24 cultivators, 42 main agricultural labourers, 267 in house hold industries, 12,393 other workers, 339 marginal workers, 2 marginal cultivators, 5 marginal agricultural labourers, 27 marginal workers in household industries and 305 other marginal workers.

As per the religious census of 2011, Sattur had 91.3% Hindus, 3.45% Muslims, 5.13% Christians, 0.01% Sikhs, 0.02% Jains, and 0.09% following other religions.

== Politics ==
Sattur elects one MLA to the Tamil Nadu Legislative Assembly. A. Kadarkarairaj from Dravida Munnetra Kazhagam party is the MLA of Sattur since 2026.

From 2009, Sattur (state assembly constituency) is part of Virudhunagar (Lok Sabha constituency); formerly it was known as the Sivakasi (Lok Sabha constituency). Manickam Tagore is the MP from Virudhunagar since 2019.

== Industries ==
Sattur is well known as a fountain-pen nib, steel rolling mills and tongue cleaner manufacturing center. It is probably the only place in India that continues to this date, in this line of business as a Cottage Industry. These industries are run by individuals as small scale family businesses. Many illiterate people are skilled in this area and manufacture good products. These industries are not supported by State/ Central governments and there is no social welfare schemes for these labourers and their family. Other small scale cottage units like Printing press, Fireworks and Match box/Matchstick industries are also present, scattered around the town. Stainless steel tongue cleaner is another important product that is manufactured here and supplied throughout India. Fathima Steel Rolling mill involves in this work for more than four decades.

A fairly large part of the population is involved in Matchstick manufacturing industry. Also, there are timber depots and raw material suppliers exclusively for the safety match and firework sectors in this area.

Match-stick frames (a collection of wood-strips to hold individual match sticks), Racks (stacks holding individual frames), and various other items for match factories continue to be supplied locally as also to various other parts of Tamil Nadu. Log-wood, another raw material for these industry, is procured from other nearby towns such as Tenkasi, Nagercoil and the neighboring state Kerala.

== Cuisine ==
Sattur Kara Sevu is a deep fried crispy snack popular here. It is prepared using gram flour, rice flour and spices.

== Transport ==
Railway is the main form of transport locally. The town is well-connected with neighboring places by road and railway. The surrounding places are well connected by bus government operated transport and private bus services. The Mini Bus services (Private) connects the villages nearby in effective way. The railway station has computerized reservation counter and the railway station code for Sattur is SRT. The nearest airport is Madurai (77 km from Sattur) and nearest sea port is Thoothukudi (80 km from Sattur ). Direct Trains are available to Chennai, Coimbatore, Bangalore, Mumbai, Mysuru, Hyderabad, Kolkata and New Delhi. The National Highway, NH7 runs through the town. As Railway station and Bus Stand lies next to each other it is easy for passengers. Direct buses are available to Chennai, Bangalore, Puducherry, Velankanni, Vellore, Coimbatore, Tiruppur, Erode, Salem.

== Villages ==
Villages in the Sattur subdistrict:

- Annaikaraipatti
- Alampatti
- Ammapatti
- Athipatti
- Ayyampatti
- Banduvarpatti
- Chinnagollapatti
- Chinnakamanpatti
- Chinnathambiyapuram
- Chatrapatti
- D. Reddiyapatti
- D.Chinnodaipatti
- E. Ramanathapuram
- Golwarpatti
- Kalaperumalpatti
- Kangarakottai
- Kanjampatti
- Karisalpatti
- Kattalampatti
- Kosukkundu
- Kottaipachcheri
- Kuganparai
- Kumaralingapuram
- Kundalakkuttu
- Madamchinnodaipatti
- Masarpatti
- Melamadai
- Mettamalai
- Mullai nagar
- Maruda nagar
- Mudittalai Nagalapuram
- Mulliseval Muthusamipuram
- Mullisevel
- Muthandipuram
- Muthulingapuram
- N.Mettupatti
- Nallamanayakkanpatti
- Nallamuthanpatti
- Nalli
- Othaiyal
- Othaiyal Mettupatti
- Ovanayakkanpatti
- Padandal
- Pappakudi
- Peddureddipatti
- Perayyampatti
- Periagollapatti
- Pottireddiyapatti
- Ravuthampatti
- Sanankulam
- Sandaiyur
- Sankarapandiyapuram
- Sattur
- Servaikaranpatti
- Sevalpatti
- Sinduvampatti
- Sippipparai
- Sirukulam
- Subramaniyapuram
- Surankudi
- Thlukkankurichchi
- Uppattur
- Uthuppatti
- Vadamalaipuram
- Vazhavandhal puram
- Vannimadai
- Veppilaipatti
- Venkatachalapuram
