= Nalli, Sattur =

Nalli
- Village
- Country: India
- State: Tamil Nadu
- District: Virudhunagar district
- Taluk: Sattur taluk

Government
  - Type: Panchayati Raj

Area
  - Total: 1,589.69 ha (3,928.2 acres)

Population (2011)
  - Total: 2,774
- PIN Code: 626205

Nalli is a village located in the Sattur Taluk of Virudhunagar district in Tamil Nadu, India. It is situated approximately 18 kilometers from Sattur and 7 kilometers from Kovilpatti. The village has 811 households and a population of 2,774 split into 1,387 males and 1,387 females. Nalli's Pin Code is 626205.

== Demographics ==
- (0–6 years): 245
- (7+ years): 2529

== Literacy ==
Overall Literacy Rate: 79.95% (Tamil Nadu average: 80.09%) with Male Literacy: 88.99% and Female Literacy: 71.08%.

== Governance ==
Nalli is administered by an elected Sarpanch under the Panchayati Raj system.

== Caste Composition ==
Scheduled Castes: 424 (15.28% of total population)

== Workforce ==
Total Workers: 1,620

- Main Workers: 1,526
- Marginal Workers: 94

Occupations:

- Cultivators: 202
- Agricultural Labourers: 612

== Geographical Location and Infrastructure ==
Nalli is 10 km from Kovilpatti, the nearest town, and connected by public and private bus services. The nearest railway station is 5–10 km away. It spans 1589.69 hectares, with 388.82 hectares for agriculture. Of this, 108.82 hectares are irrigated, and 894.33 hectares are culturable waste land. The surrounding lake, which has been low on water for years, is hoped to boost local cultivation once fully filled.

Healthcare services include a community health centre and a primary health centre 5–10 km away. The village also has a veterinary hospital with 1 doctor and 2 paramedics, and a dispensary nearby.

Nalli has 4 government pre-primary, primary, middle, secondary, and senior secondary schools. Higher education options are available in nearby towns: Kovilpatti (arts and science college), Nalattinputhur (engineering and polytechnic colleges), and Tirunelveli (medical college).

== Singamadai Ayyanar Temple ==
Singamadai Ayyanar Temple, located 18 km from Sattur in Tamil Nadu, is dedicated to Singamadai Ayyanar, who is accompanied by his consorts Purana and Pushkala. The temple's history dates back 500 years, when a devotee from Srivilliputtur, carrying sand to worship Aiyanar and other deities, saved a village from flooding by placing the sand near Singamadai Lake. This act led to the construction of the temple. Other deities in the temple include Karuppasamy, Petchi Amman, and Vinayaka.

Major festivals like Maha Shivaratri and Karthigai are celebrated, attracting devotees from nearby villages. The temple also holds a unique tradition of offering fruits in leaf boxes.
