= Biological illustration =

Use of technical illustration in biology

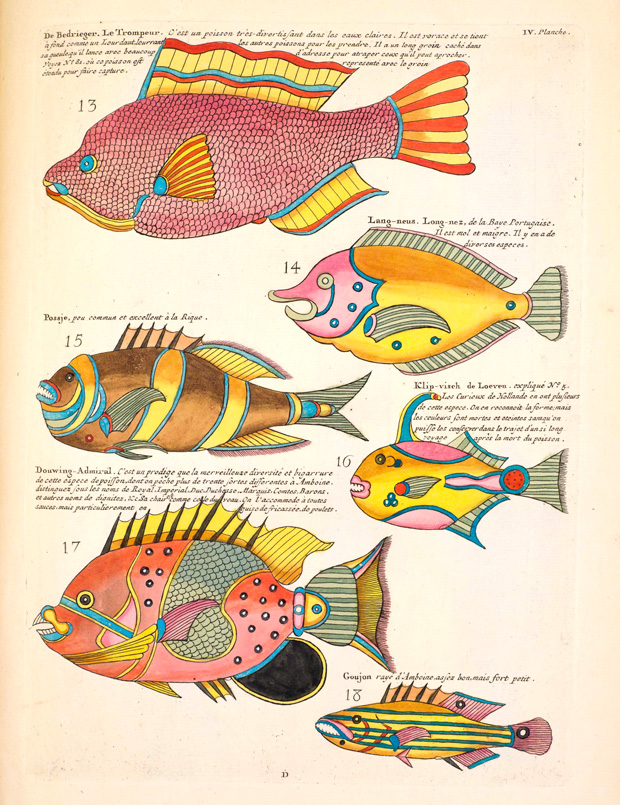
Illustration from the book Histoire naturelle by Louis Renard, published in Amsterdam in 1754.

Biological illustration is the use of technical illustration to visually communicate the structure and specific details of biological subjects of study. This can be used to demonstrate anatomy, explain biological functions or interactions, direct surgical procedures, distinguish species, and other applications. The scope of biological illustration can range from the whole organism level to microscopic.

== Subcategories ==
Types of biological illustrations include:

- Medical illustration
- Botanical illustration
- Zoological illustration

== History ==
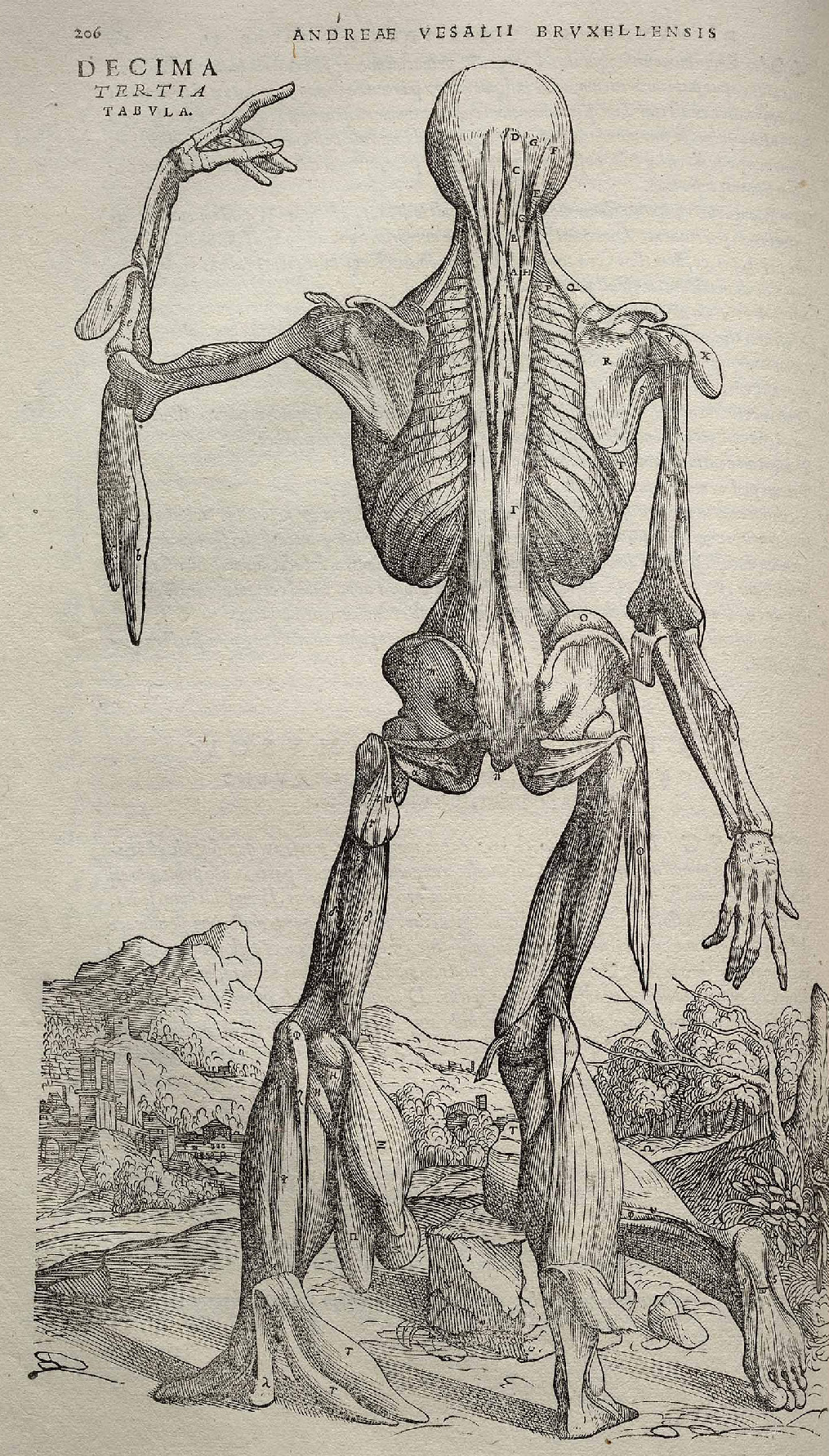
Image from Andreas Vesalius's De humani corporis fabrica (1543), page 206

Historically, biological illustrations have been in use since the beginning of man's exploration and attempts to understand the world. The Paleolithic cave paintings were so detailed that species and breeds of many of the depicted animals can be recognized. For example, in the Chauvet-Pont-d'Arc Cave (circa 30,000 BC), at least 13 different species have been identified. In one prehistoric cave (circa 15,000 BC), there is a drawing of a mammoth with a darkened area where the heart should be. If this is indeed the intention of the illustration, it would be the world's first anatomical illustration.

During the Renaissance, artist and scientist Leonardo da Vinci famously sketched his observations from human dissections, as well as his studies of plants and the flight of birds. In the mid-16th century, the physician Andreas Vesalius compiled and published the De humani corporis fabrica, a collection of textbooks on human anatomy superior to any illustrations that had been produced until that point. In the early 1600s, the explorer Étienne de Flacourt documented his travels to Madagascar, and illustrated the unique fauna there, setting a precedent for future explorers as world travel became a more feasible reality.

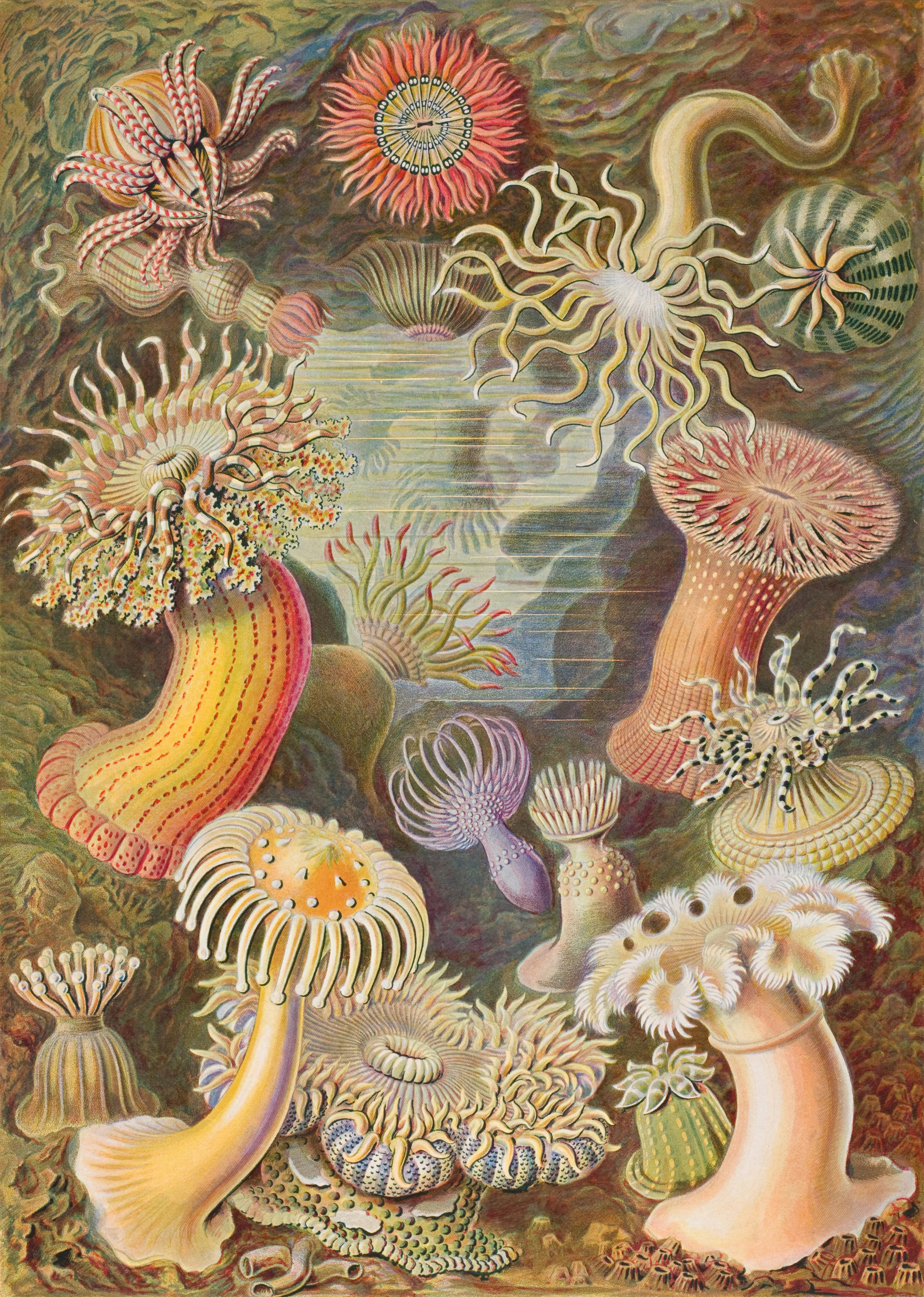
49th plate from Ernst Haeckel's Kunstformen der Natur of 1904, showing various sea anemones, classified as Actiniae.

During his five-year voyage aboard HMS Beagle, Charles Darwin wrote and illustrated The Voyage of the Beagle, which was published in 1839. At the beginning of the 20th century, one of the most prolific biological illustrators, Ernst Haeckel, discovered, described, and named thousands of new species, and his published work, Kunstformen der Natur, contained hundreds of prints of various organisms, many of which were first described by Haeckel himself.

== Education and employment ==
Biological illustrations can be found in use in history and anatomy textbooks, nature guides, natural history museums, scientific magazines and journals, botanical gardens, zoos and aquariums, surgical training manuals, and many more applications. Biological illustration can be pursued as a degree in the undergraduate, graduate, and technical college levels. Preparation for a biological illustration career can include a background of art or science, or a combination of both. Skills development in biological illustration can involve two-dimensional art, animation, graphic design, and sculpture (such as necessary in custom prosthetics).

It is possible to work in biological illustration without a specific degree, but a degree will significantly enhance an illustrator's employment opportunities. Job applications can be submitted to scientific researchers, publishers of scientific manuscripts, research institutions, museums, scientific foundations, commercial book publishers or university presses, individual authors, hospitals and medical training centers, local and state government offices, park services, environmental control offices, special government committees, printers and commercial publishing houses. Employment opportunities in the biological illustration profession are fairly limited, full-time jobs are not often available, and many experienced illustrators are self-employed, on short-term contracts, or work in science communication careers with few illustration duties. Many illustrators prefer the flexibility of their own working arrangements, but this is only possible when they are well established in the field and capable of locating work when needed. Many freelance illustrators supplement their salary with commercial illustration and graphic design projects, as is common in many art careers.

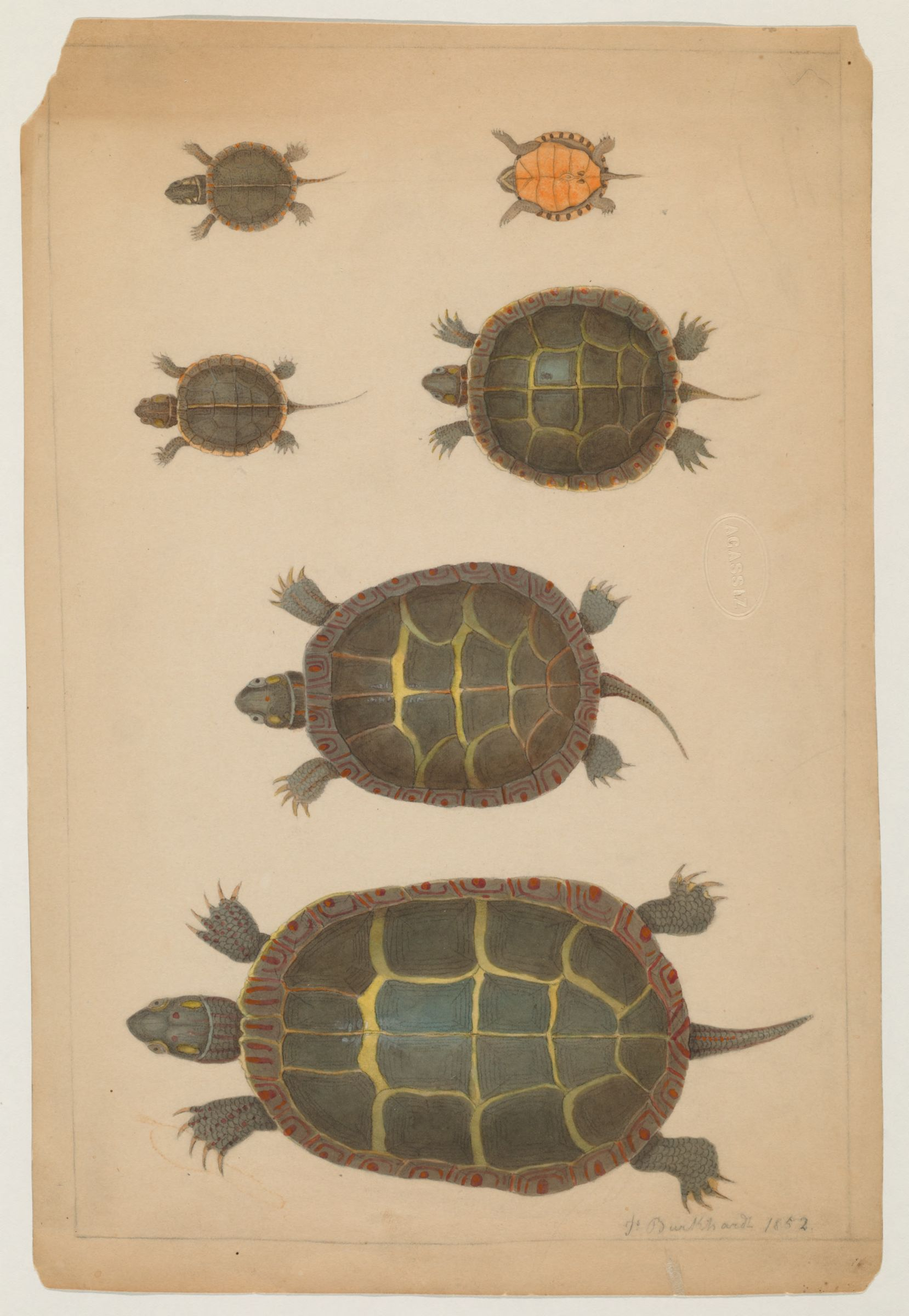
Zoological illustration by Jacques Burkhardt for Louis Agassiz's 1857-1877 Contributions to the Natural History of the United States.

== Technique ==
Biological illustration has traditionally employed the techniques of using carbon dust, color pencil, stipple pen and ink, lithography, watercolor and gouache; however, digital illustration has recently become more important in the field. Every professional scientific illustration begins with multiple rough sketches. Many details must be discussed between the artist and scientist before a final drawing can be completed, and additional preliminary drawings must be prepared in order to work out aesthetic details.

Pen and ink (often a flex nib fountain pen) line illustrations are clean, crisp, clear, and inexpensive to produce, making them ideal for biological illustrations. Ink drawings are typically made on a heavy drawing paper, such as Bristol board.

Digital illustration can be done using a monitor or drawing tablet, computer software such as Adobe Illustrator or Photoshop, or it can be used in post-production after the illustration has been drawn by hand.
