= Ayyampatti =

- village
- Country: India
- State: Tamil Nadu
- District: Virudhunagar
- Taluk: Sattur
- Panchayat: Chinnakollapatti

Government
  - Panchayat President: S.Palanisamy

Population
  - Total: 350

Languages
  - Official: Tamil
- Time zone: UTC+5:30 (IST)
- Literacy: approx. 60%

Ayyampatti (Village ID 641733) is a village in the Sattur Taluk of Virudhunagar district, in the Indian state of Tamil Nadu. The village lies on the southern banks of Vaippar river. According to the 2011 census, it has a population of 499 living in 150 households.

Major industries include agriculture and matchbox manufacturing. There were ten match factories prior to 2000 but as of 2011, only five are functioning. Cottage industries also play a major role in the local economy. Its main agriculture product is rice growing.

Ayyampatti has one Panchayat union school, which offers education to the children.

The village has a community hall which is used for marriages and other functions.

== Culture ==
In the month of May, the villagers celebrate Kaliamman koil Vaikasi pongal. This is a three-day festival in the second or third week of Vaikāci. As well, the Kannimari Amman festival is celebrated in the Tamil month of Puraṭṭāci.
