= Singamadai Ayyanar Temple, Nalli =

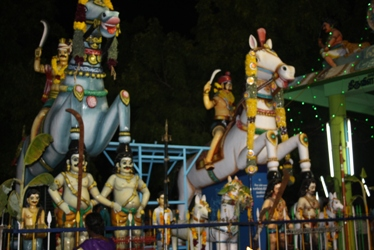
Ayyanar in the temple

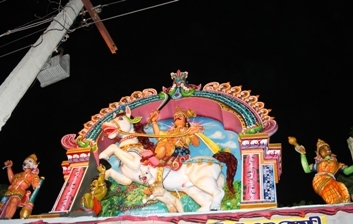
Rear facade of the temple

Singamadai Ayyanar Temple is an Aiyanar temple in Nalli, at a distance of 18 km from Sattur in Virudhunagar district in Tamil Nadu (India).

== Presiding deity ==
The presiding deity of the temple is Singamadai Ayyanar. He is flanked by his consorts Purana and Pushkala.

== History and Legends ==
Due to a drought 500 years ago, a devotee from Srivilliputtur left his native place, taking sand from the temple where he worshipped Ayyanar, Petchi Amman, and Karuppayi Amman. As he neared Nalli village, heavy rains caused the local lake, Singamadai, to threaten flooding. He tried to control the water, but when he was unable to, he placed the sand he carried on the ground and went for help. Upon returning, he was amazed to find the water had stopped, and the land was saved. A celestial voice then revealed that Ayyanar had intervened to protect the land and crops. Ayyanar promised his blessings if a temple were built in his honor. The villagers informed the Sevalpatti Zamindar, who constructed the temple near the lake. As it was close to Singamadai lake, the deity was named Nalli Singamadai Ayyanar.

The temple houses Ayyanar with his consorts, Poorna and Pushkala, and Pechiyamman, also known as Manjanai Pechi Amman, along with other deities. The biggest festival takes place three days after Shivarathri when Karuppachami, after seeking Ayyanar’s permission, goes hunting. The temple, open from 7 AM to 5 PM, hosts a special pooja for Ayyanar at noon. Devotees believe that bathing and circling the deity three times on Fridays relieves mental worries, and keeping turmeric from Pechiyamman’s temple in the home brings auspiciousness. The temple is located 11 km from Kovilpatti on the way to Chathur.

== Other deities ==
In this temple, Nondi Karuppasamy, Pathinettampadi Karuppasamy, Petchi Amman, Vinayaka, Saptamatas, Nāga, Vairasamy, Nandhi, Veerabadrar, Villadi Karuppasamy, Muthukauppan, Lada Sanyasi, and Valladamuthu are found. Rakkachi, Maadaan, Madathi, Badhala and Kandigai are also found in this temple.

== Festival ==
During Tamil month of Masi, Maha Shivaratri held in grand manner. On the third day of During Maha Shivatri, after getting the approval of Ayynar Karuppasamy goes on Parivettai. On that day, Ayyanar would be taken in a procession on a carriage around the village. Karthigai, Maha Shivatri, Panguni Uthiram, Chitra Pournami, Adi Amavasai and on special days, special pujas and festivals are held. During these festivals, devotees from nearby 30 villages are participating. On festival days ear piercing and tonsuring are done by the devotees in fulfilment of vows. Goat and other animal sacrifices are also done. Women in large light lamps in the temple. They cook rice and offer them to the deity. The devotees would keep the seeds in a pot and come in large numbers as a mark of expressing the prosperity. They would carry the pot containing fire. The speciality of the temple is that woman devotees, would have coconut and bananas in a box made of leaves and worship the deity. This is called pettippazham, keeping the fruit in a box and offering.

== Cultivation ==
The lake, in 500 acre area, was not filled fully for nearly five years and local people affected for some time. People are expecting that if the water is filled fully in the lake it would help them for their paddy cultivation and other activities.
