= Masarpatti =

Coordinates: 9°17′N 78°02′E

Masarpatti is a small village located 14 km from Sattur, Thoothukudi District, Tamil Nadu, India.
