= Flex nib =

Non-rigid nib design for fountain pens

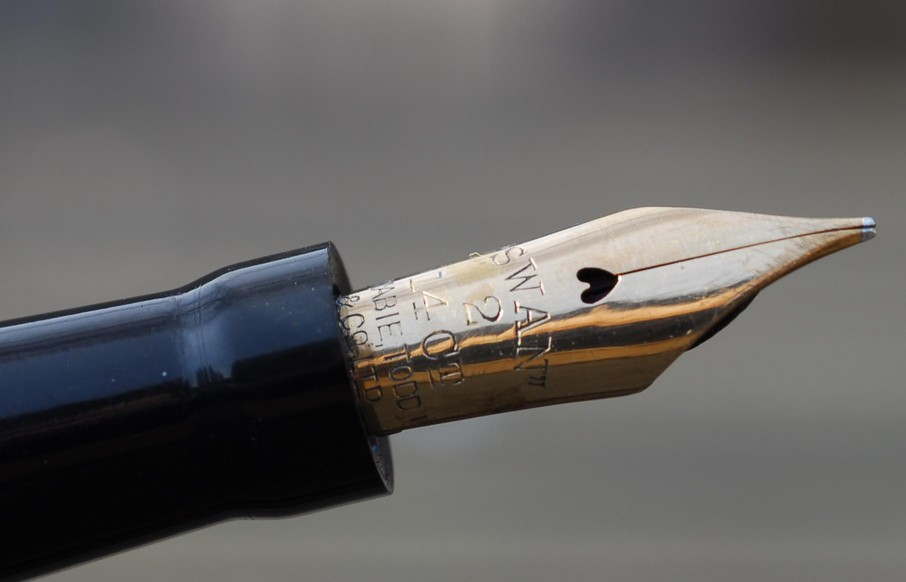
Mabie Todd Swan 14k gold flexible nib

A Flex nib (or flexible nib) is a type of fountain pen nib that can create different line widths. Due to its non-rigid structure, a flex nib allows a writer to control line width by adjusting the pressure of the pen on paper. Increased pressure will cause the two tines of the nib to separate slightly, allowing more ink to flow onto the page. A lighter grip will allow the tines to remain close together and produce a thinner line. The range of line widths from a fountain pen is limited; however, the most flexible nibs can produce a width about six times greater than that of a regular nib. One of the most flexible nibs are sometimes known among collectors as "wet noodles".

Flex nibs should not be confused with soft or semi-flex nibs. Soft nibs offer a cushioned feel, the ability to produce varying line wetness/color saturation, and a small amplitude in line width. Experts differentiate the two by age; no current nib manufacturer produces nibs with an equivalent level of flexibility as vintage flex nibs.

== History and construction ==
Fountain pen nibs were originally designed similarly to feather quills. Flex nibs were much more common on pens made before the 1930s. They were typically offered as an option on a manufacturer's pens so that the same model could come with a standard rigid nib or flex. Flex nibs were relatively common in Waterman pens. Model 22 was a popular choice for flex. Other brands, like Sheaffer, sold very few flex nibs. Flex nibs remained relatively common on some European pens into the 1950s, notably on Montblanc pens.

Flex nibs require considerable skill to make and were typically manufactured with a 14k gold alloy. This alloy gave the nib enough flexibility to support the classic Spencerian or Copperplate writing styles. At the same time, a higher proportion of gold would be liable to bend permanently. Steel was rarely used because the steels of the time had not developed resistance to corrosion. Inks were acidic and would cause the steel to corrode, limiting the longevity of the nib. The Esterbrook 9128 nib is one example of a steel flex nib.

Even moderately flexible nibs are difficult to use. As the nib tines spread apart, friction between the pen and page increases dramatically. Therefore, downward pressure must be carefully controlled to avoid damaging the nib while lateral force increases or decreases depending on the separation of the tines.

== Spring back ==
Flex nibs used for the Spencerian or Copperplate writing styles should possess the property of "spring back" or "return", meaning that their tines should close back together extremely quickly when released. This is essential to the rapid transition from thick to thin required by common styles of calligraphy.

== Dip pens ==
Flex nibs are commonly available for modern dip pens, owing to their market and intended use. These are almost always made of steel, because flexible nibs can be made more easily with steel alloys than the available gold alloys.

== Modern flex nibs ==
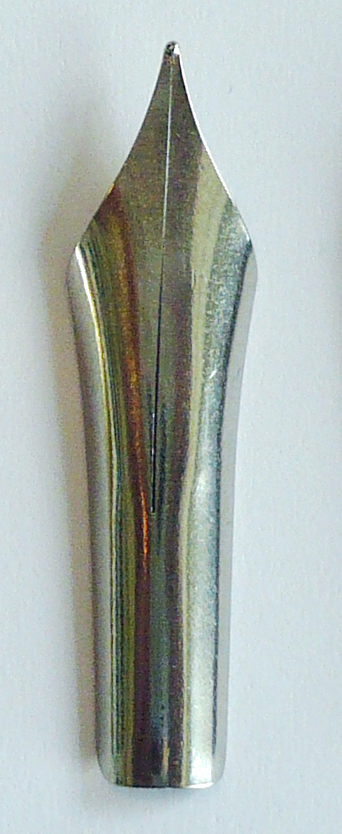
Semi-flex chrome plated stainless steel nib, 2016

Flex nibs, while still widely available in dip-pen form, are quite rare for modern fountain pens. This is due, in part, to the decrease in popularity of script styles using flex pens during the early 20th century. At this time, there was a move towards more rigid nibs. Another factor leading to their decrease in use was the level of skill required to ensure no damage to the nib's tines. The Pilot Namiki Falcon is an example of a modern pen with a somewhat flexible nib, although its degree of flexibility is very moderate by vintage standard, reducing the danger of damage and difficulty of use. An even more flexible contemporary pen is the Pilot Custom 742 and 743 with Falcon nib. These pens are much more flexible than a Pilot Falcon (a.k.a. Namiki Falcon).

A very few number of "nibmeisters" (or nib modifiers) can both add flex and grind down the tips of modern 14K nibs to more closely match earlier examples of fountain pen flex nibs.

In recent years, several relatively cheap flexible nib fountain pens came onto the market, for example, Noodler's Creaper and Ahab models, which use steel-alloy nibs in lieu of 14.4K gold-alloy nibs to achieve a wide range of flex.

These nibs may lack some of the control of gold nibs, such as the capability to make hairlines comparable to a traditional steel dip nib. They also do not possess the same "spring-back" that some 14K fountain pen nibs offer. However, they are more forgiving in the case of accidental over-flexing, given steel's more resilient characteristics. They are also often sold at a more accessible pricepoint.

== See also ==
- List of pen types, brands and companies

== Notes ==
- Dyas A. Lawson. "The joy of flex, part one". Stylophiles.
- Richard Binder. "Nibs II: Beyond the Basics with Specialty Nibs".
- Mike Stevens (1999). "Modern Flex". Stylophile's Online Magazin.
