= Nib (pen) =

Writing point of a pen

A diagram of a typical pointed nib

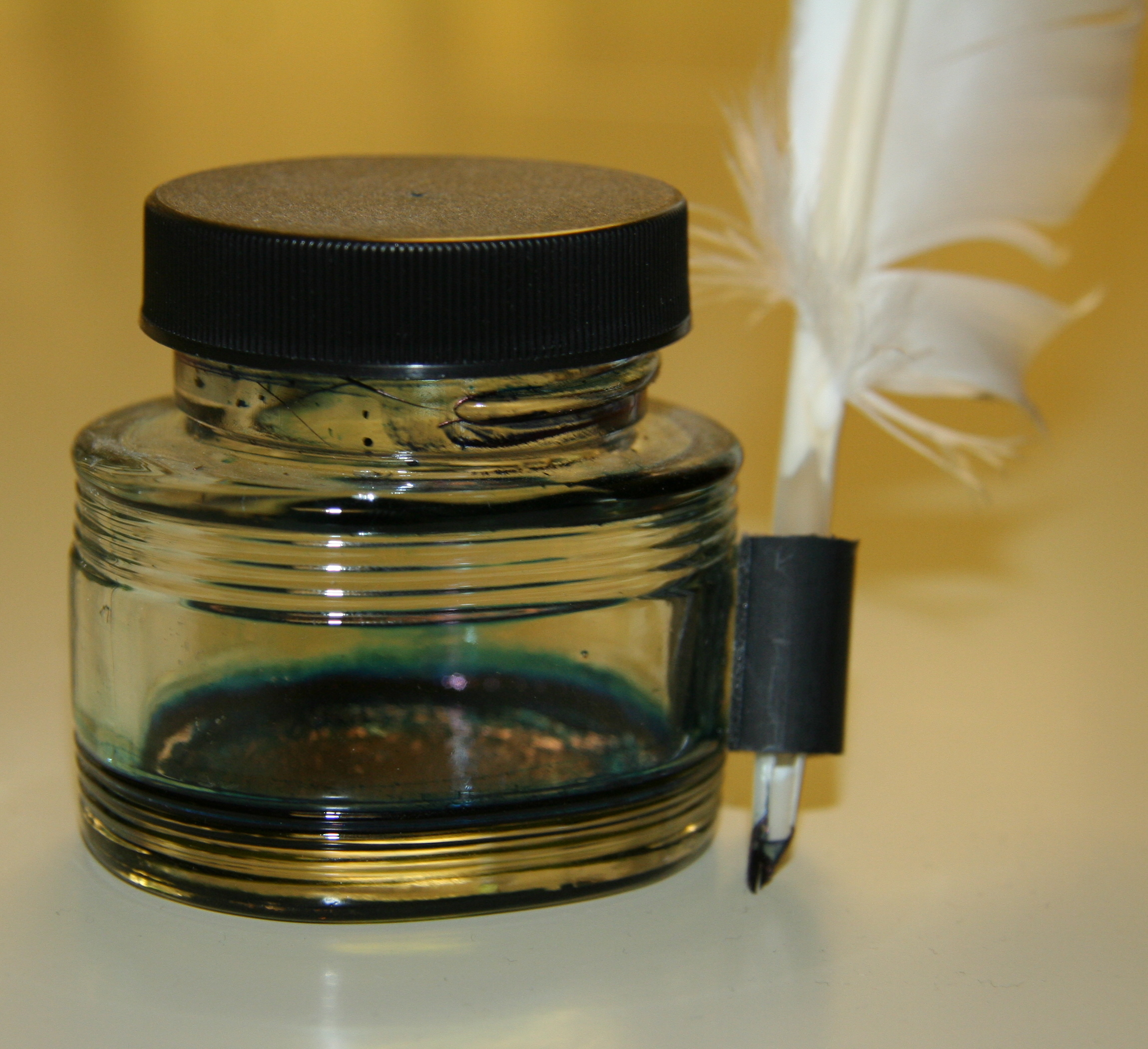
Quill pen and ink bottle

A nib is the part of a quill, dip pen, fountain pen, ball point, or stylus which comes into contact with the writing surface in order to deposit ink. Different types of nibs vary in their purpose, shape and size, as well as the material from which they are made.

== History ==
=== Quill ===
The quill replaced the reed pen across Europe by the Early Middle Ages and remained the main writing tool of the West for nearly a thousand years until the 17th century. Quills are fashioned by cutting a nib into the end of a feather obtained from a fairly large bird, such as a goose, traditionally from its left wing. A quill has the advantage of being more durable and more flexible than a reed pen, and it can also retain ink in the hollow shaft of the feather, known as the calamus, allowing more writing time between ink dippings. The quill was in common use until the early 19th century and the advent of the metal nib. For business purposes, the quill was fairly quickly overtaken; however, it remains popular for personal use and for artistic work.

=== Metal ===
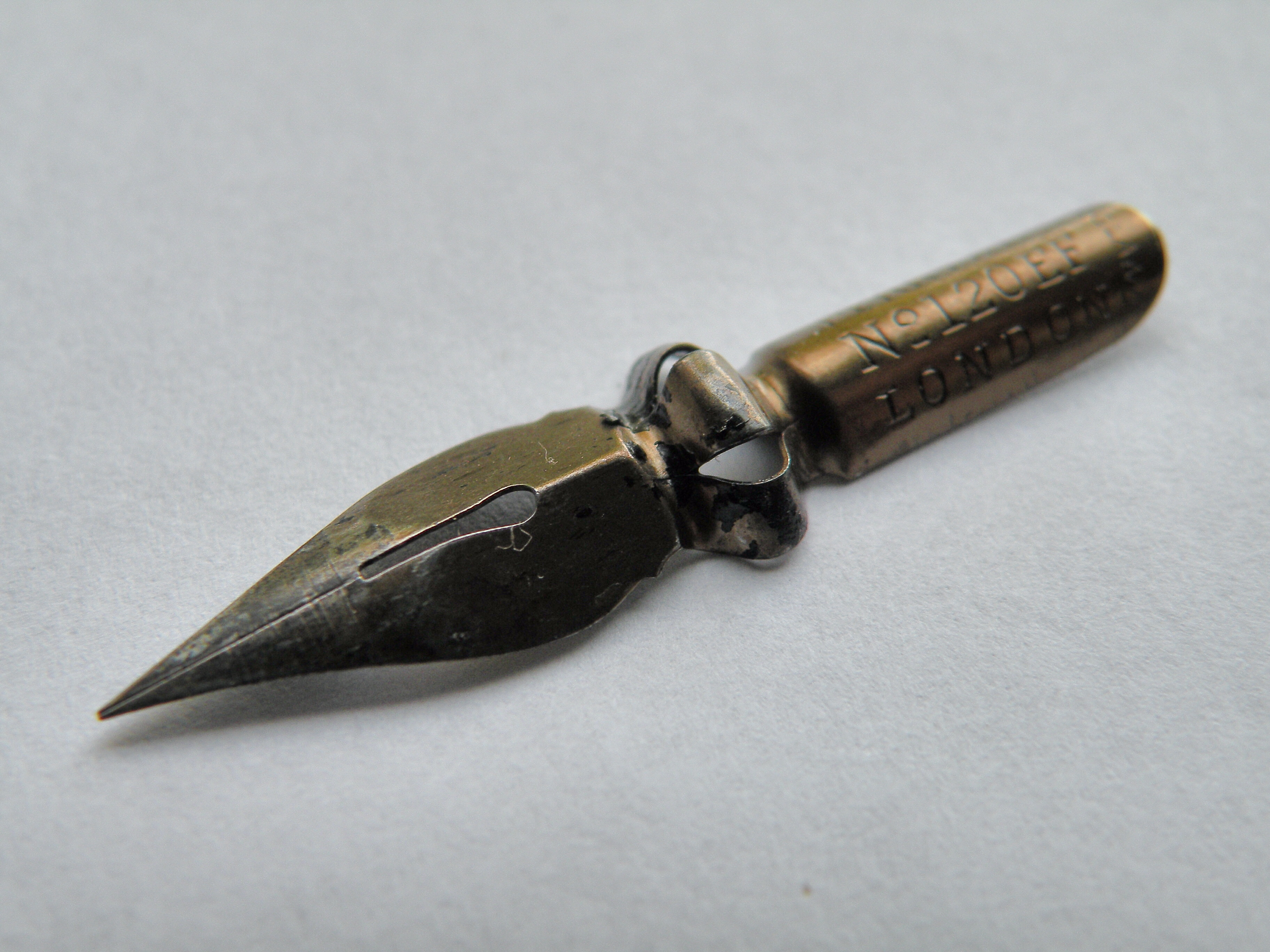
Metal nib by Perry & Co.

Metal nibs have their origins as far back as ancient Egypt and were made of metals like copper and bronze. However, the quality of writing that could be achieved with these pens was inferior to that of reed pens. Metallic nibs were made up through the 18th-century as one-off, craftsman-made luxury items. In the early 1800s, Wise in Britain, and Peregrine Williamson in the United States were the first recorded makers of steel pens as their primary occupation. It was not until the 1820s, when John Mitchell, Josiah Mason and others set up a factory in Birmingham, England to manufacture steel nibs, that their popularity took off. The metal nib retains a sharp point or edge much longer than the quill, which wears out more quickly and requires some skill to sharpen. Metal nibs are also easily manufactured to have different properties for different purposes. And because they can be attached to and removed from holders, they allow one to switch between nibs with relative ease.

== Nib brands ==
Broad nib

Pointed nib, flexed and unflexed

Major fountain pen nib production hubs currently include Germany, Japan, China, and India, key representatives being Schmidt, Jowo, Pilot, Hero, and Bock.

== Nib types ==
Pen nibs come in a variety of different shapes and sizes for different purposes but can be split into two main types: broad nibs and pointed nibs.

=== Broad nib ===
The broad nib, also called broad-edge or chisel-edge, is the older of the two nib types. It is rigid and has a flat edge. The pen is usually held at a constant angle to the horizontal; different scripts require different nib angles. Thick and thin strokes are created by varying the direction of the stroke.

Many writing styles have developed over the centuries with the broad nib, including the medieval Uncial, Blackletter and Carolingian minuscule scripts (and their variants), the Italic Hand of the Renaissance, and more recently Edward Johnston's Foundational Hand, developed in the early 20th century.

=== Pointed nib ===
The pointed nib is flexible and comes to a sharp point rather than a broad edge. Thick and thin strokes are achieved by varying the amount of pressure on the nib. Thick lines are created on downstrokes by pushing down on the nib, causing the tines to splay and allowing more ink to flow through the widened slit onto the writing surface. Lighter pressure produces less flexing of the tines, creating thinner strokes. The finest hairline strokes are created on the upstrokes and sideways strokes. Due to the shape of the pointed nib, thick lines can only be produced on downstrokes. If too much pressure is applied to the pen on an upstroke, the tines are likely to dig into the paper.

Pointed nibs originated in the 17th century and were initially created by hand from quills in a similar fashion to broad-edge nibs. Towards the end of the Industrial Revolution in the early 19th century, high demand for nibs coupled with steel manufacturing processes eventually led to the mass production of the steel nib. Pointed nibs also led to the development of newer styles of penmanship such as the English Round Hand and Copperplate scripts during the 17th and 18th centuries, as well as the Spencerian script in the 19th century.

Pointed pens are also used by artists and drafters for sketching, mapping and technical drawing. Although any pointed nib can be used for drawing, there are nibs available that resemble writing nibs but are specially designed for pen drawing.

=== Stub nib ===
A stub nib usually lies somewhere between a broad and a pointed nib. The stub nib comes to a flat point, like a broad nib, and pulling the pen down will create a wider line than a line drawn across, again, like a broad nib. The main differences are in matters of degree. In a stub nib, the nib is generally smaller than in a broad nib, though there are some very broad nibs that would be considered a stub nib. In a stub nib, the corners are more rounded than in a sharp broad nib used for decorative writing. This is because stub nibs on steel pens were invented as a reaction to the sharp and scratchy nature of the early pointed steel pens, and are intended to be for rapid and easy writing.

Many of the early steel stub nibs were marketed to professions who had a need to write large amounts of text rapidly, without caring if the text was finely written or not. Names such as Judge's Quill, or Probate Pen or Lawyer's Pen all point to the legal profession as a major type of customer. There were also other professions, like Chancellors or Congressional personnel which imply people who needed to write a lot, and to write it quickly and easily.

One finds stub nibs most often today on fountain pens. These are usually measured in millimeters (common sizes range from .9mm up to 1.1 or 1.5mm, though one can find others outside of this range). On fountain pens, the difference between a broad nib and a stub nib can get even murkier with all of the variations ranging from what's often called an Italic nib, which tends to have sharper corners like a traditional broad dip nib, to a Cursive Italic or some such variation with more rounded corners to facilitate smooth and continuous writing.

A stub nib can be efficient at creating modulation in line (thick and thin) you can get with a flexible nib, if you also wish for the smoother and easier action of a monoline (non-flexible) nib. To write with a stub nib, just as you do with a broad nib, you hold it at a consistent angle to the line of writing. For italic writing, that can be 45°. For general cursive, traditionally with a stub dip pen, one would hold the pen at 0°, or parallel to the line of writing.

One modern example of someone using a stub nib for rapid, and most certainly, extensive writing was the author Shelby Foote, the historian of the American Civil War. In an interview with the Paris Review he reveals that he wrote the entire transcript of his 3000+ page history of the Civil War with an Esterbrook #313 Probate Pen, a rather broad stub dip pen.

== Fountain pen nibs ==
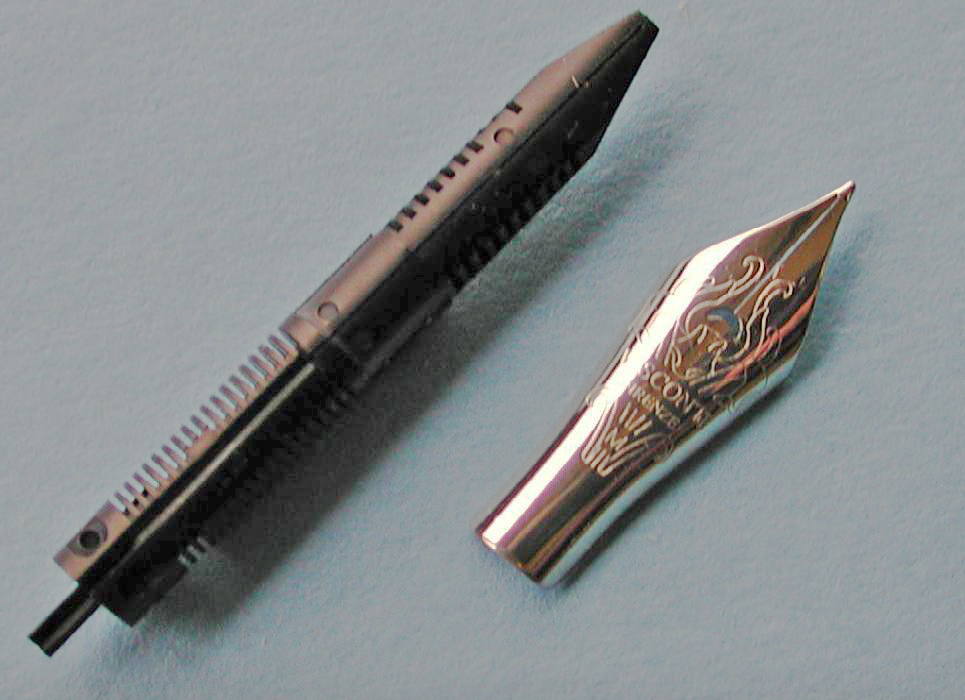
Detail of a Visconti stainless steel fountain pen nib and feed

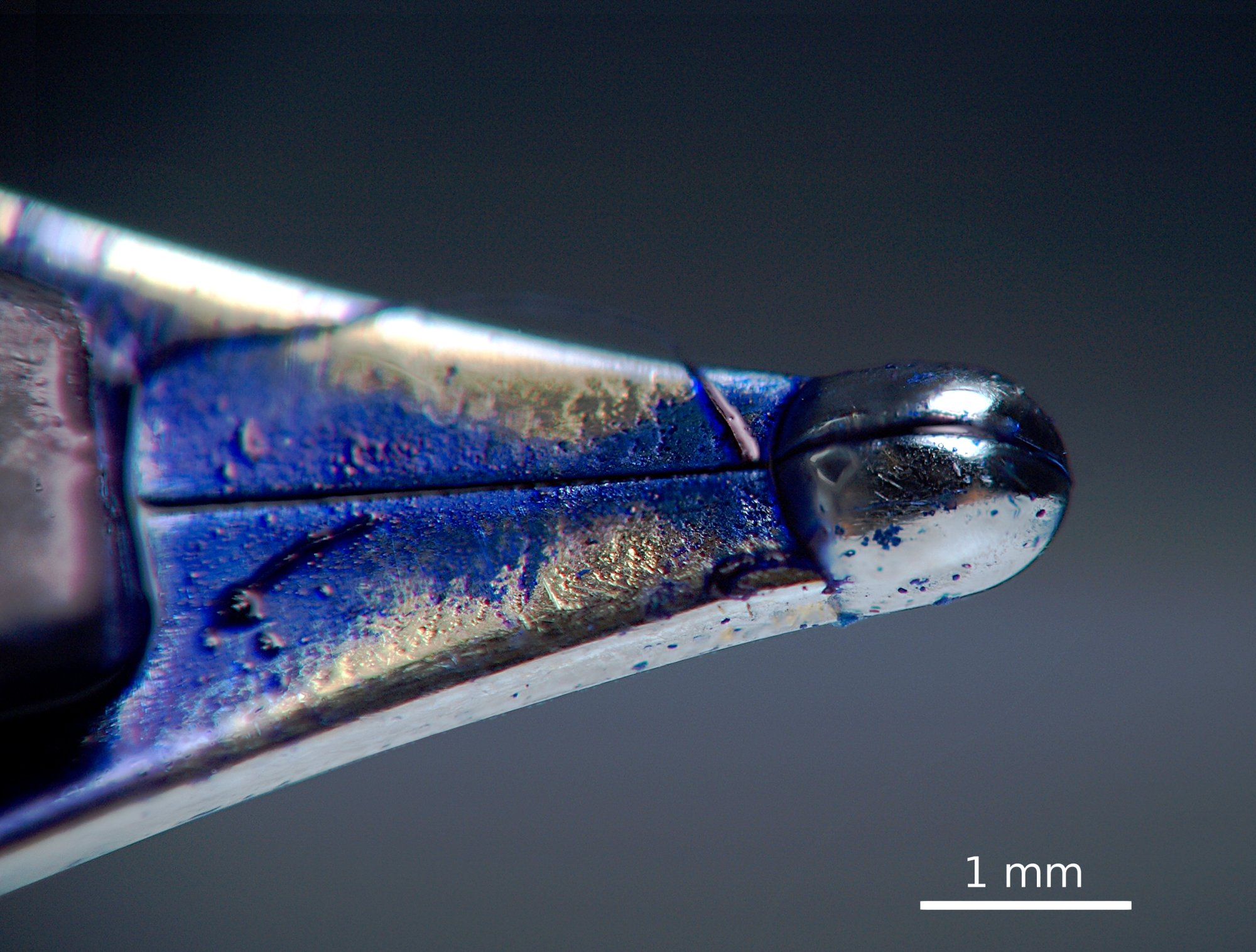
Tip of a fountain pen nib

According to Mathur et al., "the modern fountain pen nib may be traced back to the original gold nib which had a tiny fragment of ruby attached to form the wear-point." Following the discovery of the platinum group of metals which include ruthenium, osmium and iridium, "a small quantity of iridium was isolated and used on the iridium-tipped gold dip pen nibs of the 1830s". Today, nibs are usually made of stainless steel or gold alloys, with the most popular gold content being 14 carat (58⅓%) and 18 carat (75%). Titanium is a less common metal used for making nibs. Gold is considered the optimum metal for its flexibility and its resistance to corrosion, although gold's corrosion resistance is less of an issue than in the past because of better stainless steel alloys and less corrosive inks.

=== Nib plating ===
Further gold plating provides favorable wettability, which is the ability of a solid surface to reduce the surface tension of a liquid in contact with it such that it spreads over the surface.

=== Nib tipping ===
Gold and most steel and titanium nibs are tipped with a hard, wear-resistant alloy that typically includes metals from the platinum group. These metals share qualities of extreme hardness and corrosion resistance. The tipping material is often called iridium, but few, if any, nib or pen manufacturers have used tipping alloys containing iridium since the mid-1950s. The metals osmium, rhenium, ruthenium and tungsten are used instead, generally as an alloy, shaped into tiny pellets which are soldered or welded onto the nib tip before the nib slit is cut and the tip ground into its final shape. Untipped steel and titanium points will wear more rapidly due to abrasion by the paper.

=== Capillary action ===
The nib usually has a tapering slit cut down its centre, to convey the ink down the nib by capillary action, as well as a breather hole of varying shape. The breather hole allows air into the feed, and back up to the sac. The breather hole also acts as a stress relieving point, preventing the nib from cracking longitudinally from the end of the slit as a result of repeated flexing during use. Adding distance between the breather hole and the nib tip adds elasticity or flexibility to the nib.

The whole nib narrows to a point where the ink is transferred to the paper. Broad calligraphy pens may have several slits in the nib to increase ink flow and help distribute it evenly across the broad point. Nibs divided into three "tines" are commonly known as music nibs. This is because their line, which can be varied from broad to fine, is suited for writing musical scores.

=== Types of nib ===
Although the most common nibs end in a round point of various sizes (extra fine, fine, medium, broad), various other nib shapes are available. Examples of this are oblique, reverse oblique, stub, italic and 360-degree nibs.

Broader nibs are used for less precise emphasis, with the benefit of a greater level of ink shading and/or sheen on less absorbent paper. Finer nibs (e.g., EF and F) may be used for intricate corrections and alterations, at the expense of shading and sheen. Oblique, reverse oblique, stub and italic nibs may be used for calligraphic purposes or for general handwritten compositions. The line width of a particular nib may vary based on its country of origin; Japanese nibs are often thinner in general.

=== Nib flexibility ===
Flexibility is given to nibs in several ways. First, thickness of the nib metal changes flex. When the nib alloy has been pressed thick it will result in a hard nib, while thinly pressed nibs are more flexible. Nibs can be pressed so that they are thinner at the tip and thicker at the feed to mitigate stiffness or to give a more controlled flex. Second, the curve of the nib determines in part how stiff the nib will be.

Nibs pressed into more deeply convex curves, or into three or five faceted curves, will be stiffer than flatter nibs. Third, the "breather hole" size, shape, and position alter the stiffness. Heart-shaped holes will improve flex as they widen, while round, small holes stiffen the pen. Fourth, the length of the tines determines how far they can spread under pressure; shorter tines make a stiffer nib. Fifth, the alloy used can affect stiffness: as mentioned before, gold is considered superior for its flex compared to steel. Moreover, purer gold (18k and 21k) is softer than most lower gold concentration (14k) alloys.

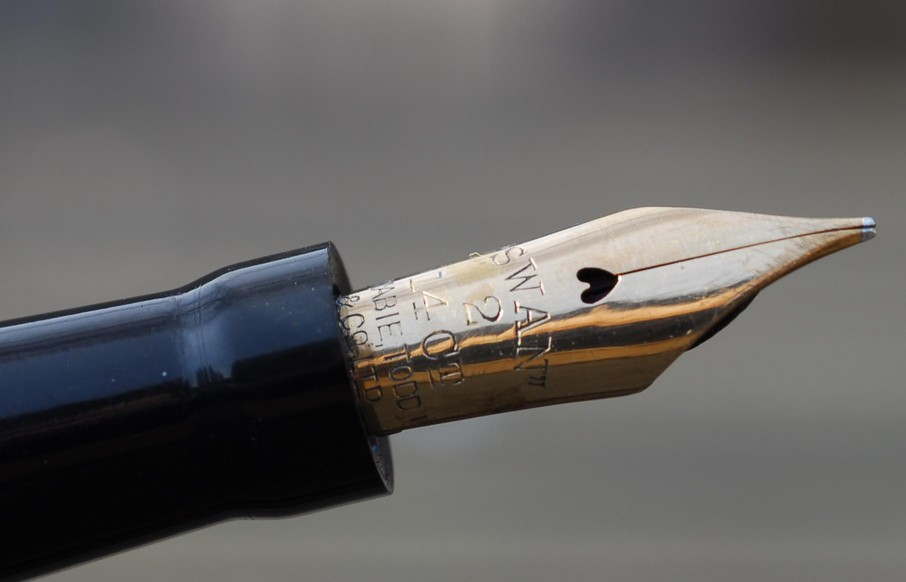
Mabie Todd Swan flexible 14k nib

Fountain pens dating from the first half of the 20th century are more likely to have flexible nibs, suited to the favored handwriting styles of the period (e.g., Copperplate script and Spencerian script). By the 1940s, writing preferences had shifted towards stiffer nibs that could withstand the greater pressure required for writing through carbon paper to create duplicate documents.

Furthermore, competition between the major pen brands such as Parker and Waterman, and the introduction of lifetime guarantees, meant that flexible nibs could no longer be supported profitably. In countries where this rivalry was not present to the same degree, for example the UK and Germany, flexible nibs are more common.

Nowadays, stiff nibs are the norm as people exchange between fountain pens and other writing modes. These more closely emulate the ballpoint pens modern users are experienced with. Despite being rigid and firm, the idea that steel nibs write "horribly" is a misconception. More flexible nibs can be easily damaged by ballpoint users who write with excessive pressure. Ideally, a fountain pen's nib glides across the paper using the ink as a lubricant and requires no pressure.

Good quality nibs that have been used appropriately are long lasting, often lasting longer than the lifetime of the original owner. Many vintage pens with decades-old nibs can still be used today.

Hooded nib of a Hero Pen

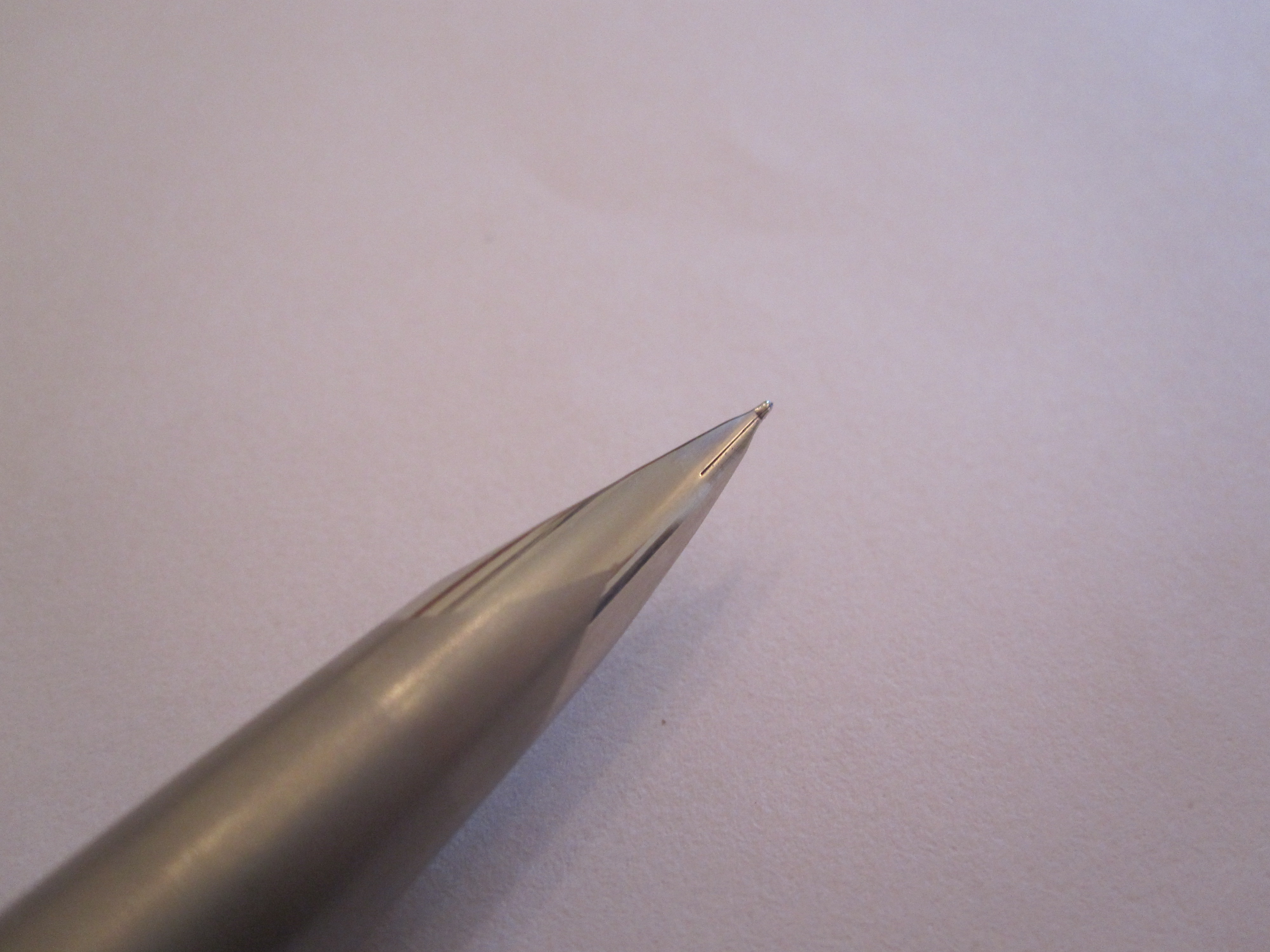
The Integral Nib of a Parker 50 (Falcon)

=== Different nib styles ===
Other styles of fountain pen nibs include hooded (e.g., Parker 51, Parker 61, 2007 Parker 100, Lamy 2000, and Hero 329), inlaid (e.g., Sheaffer Targa or Sheaffer P.F.M) or integral Nib (Parker T-1 and Falcon, Pilot Myu 701), which may also be ground to have different writing characteristics.

Users are often cautioned not to lend or borrow fountain pens as the nib "wears in" at an angle unique to each individual person. A different user is likely to find that a worn-in nib does not write satisfactorily in their hand and, furthermore, creates a second wear surface, ruining the nib for the original user. This, however, is not a point of concern in pens with modern, durable tipping material, as these pens take many years to develop any significant wear.

== Gallery ==
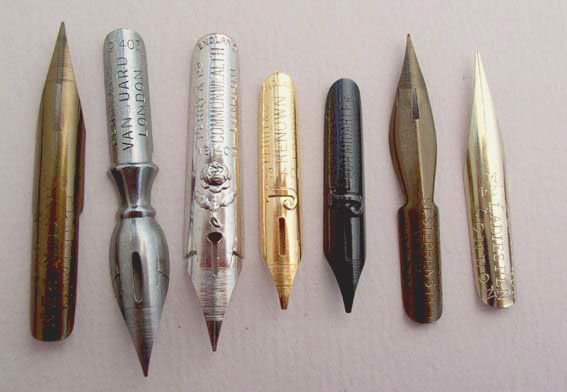
Perry & Co. pointed nibs

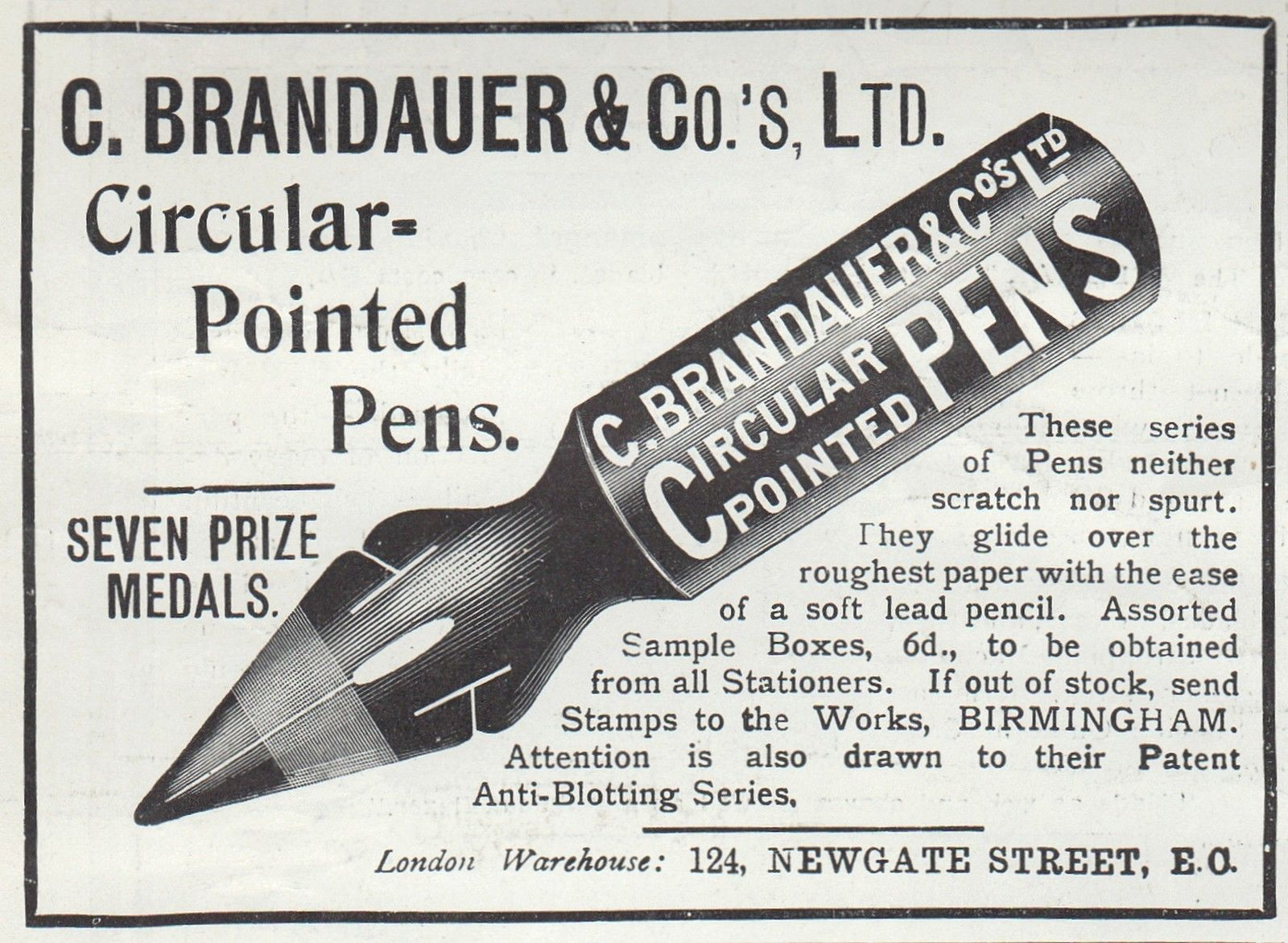
C. Brandauer & Co. ad

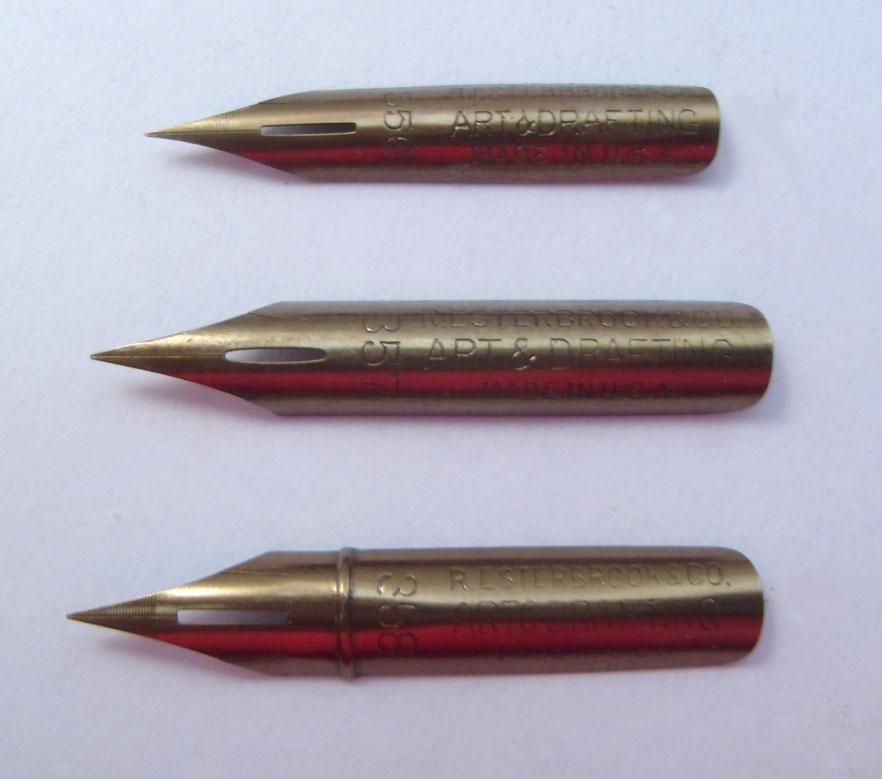
Esterbrook models

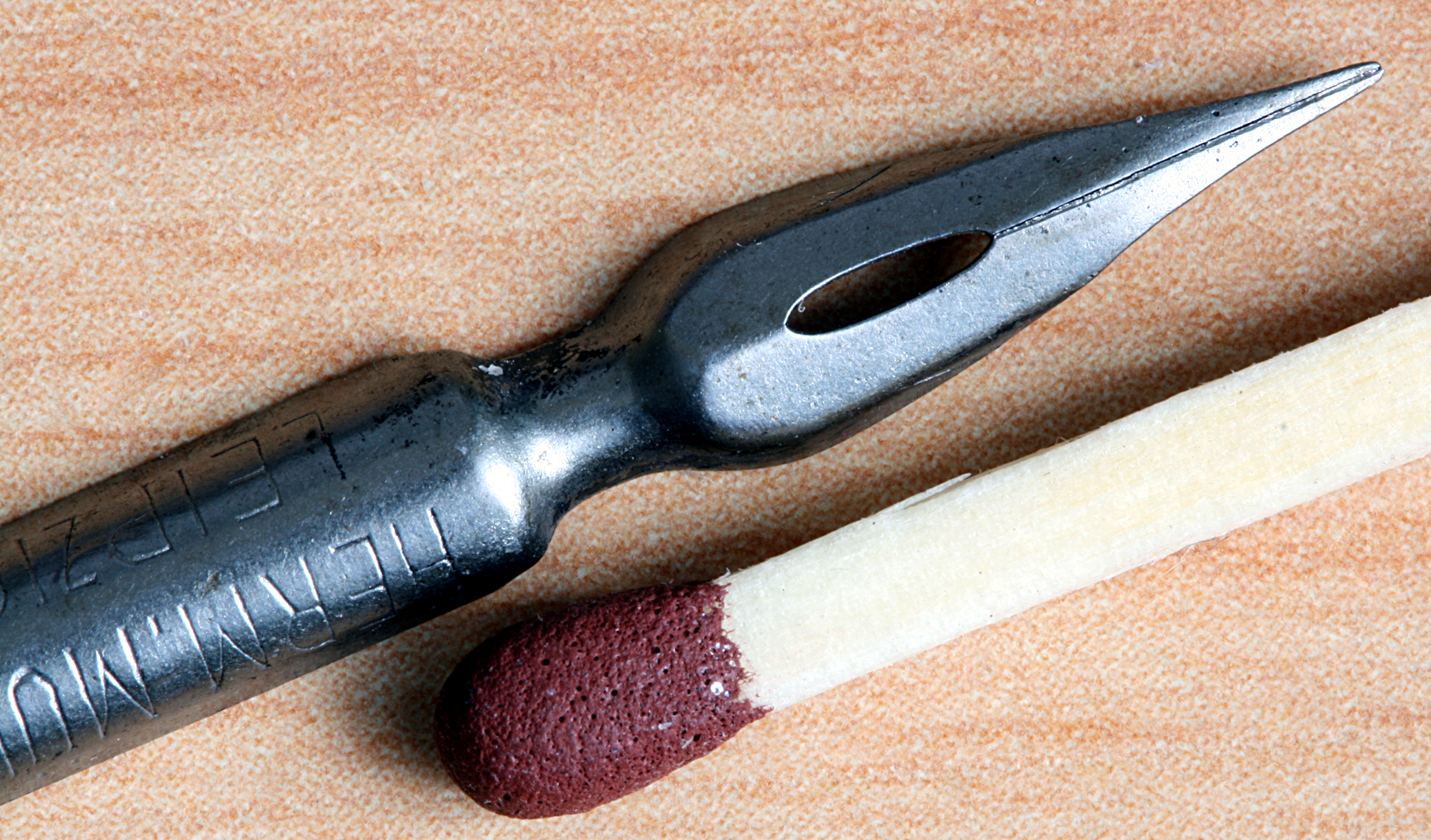
Herm. Müller nib

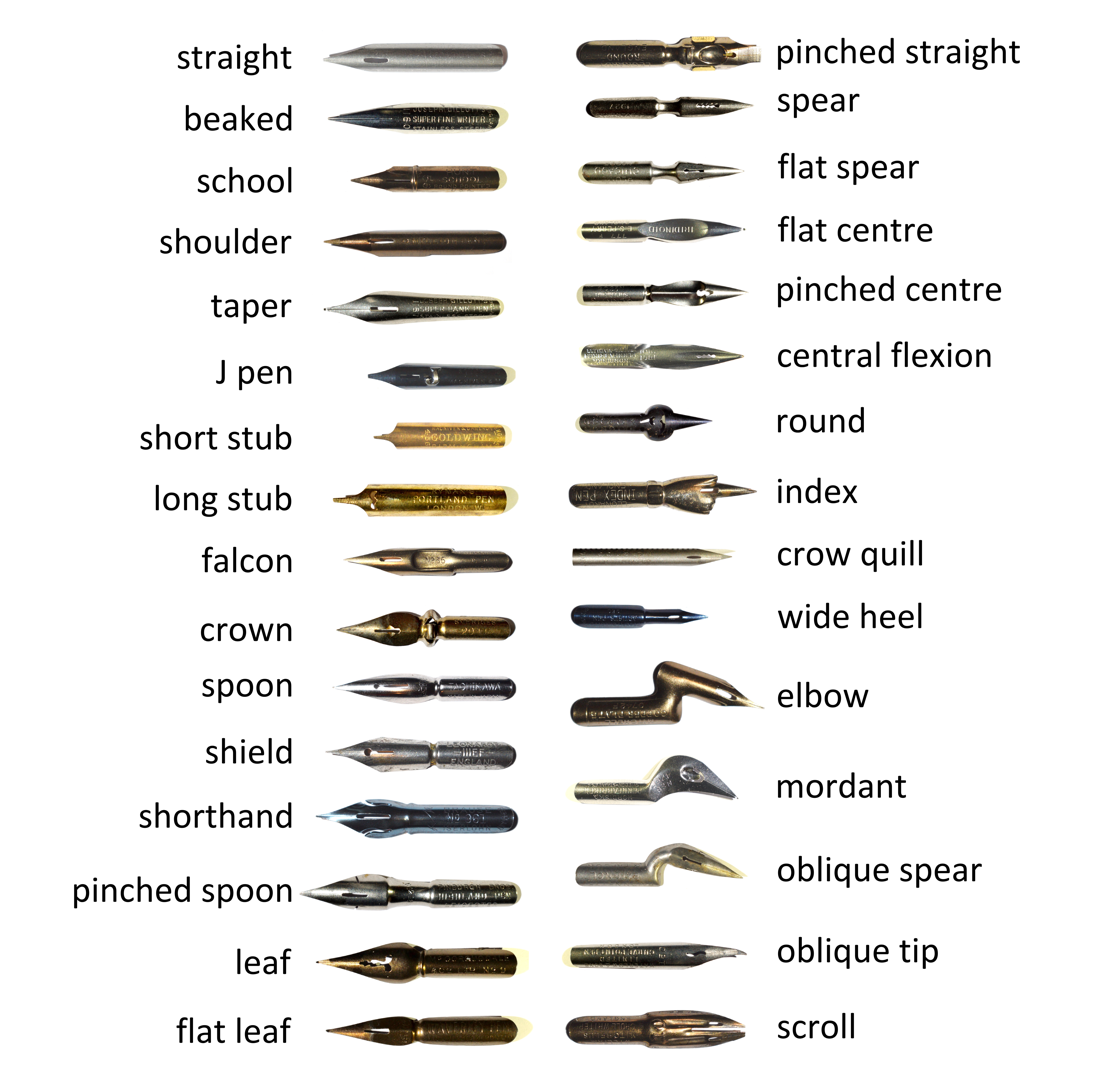
Various models

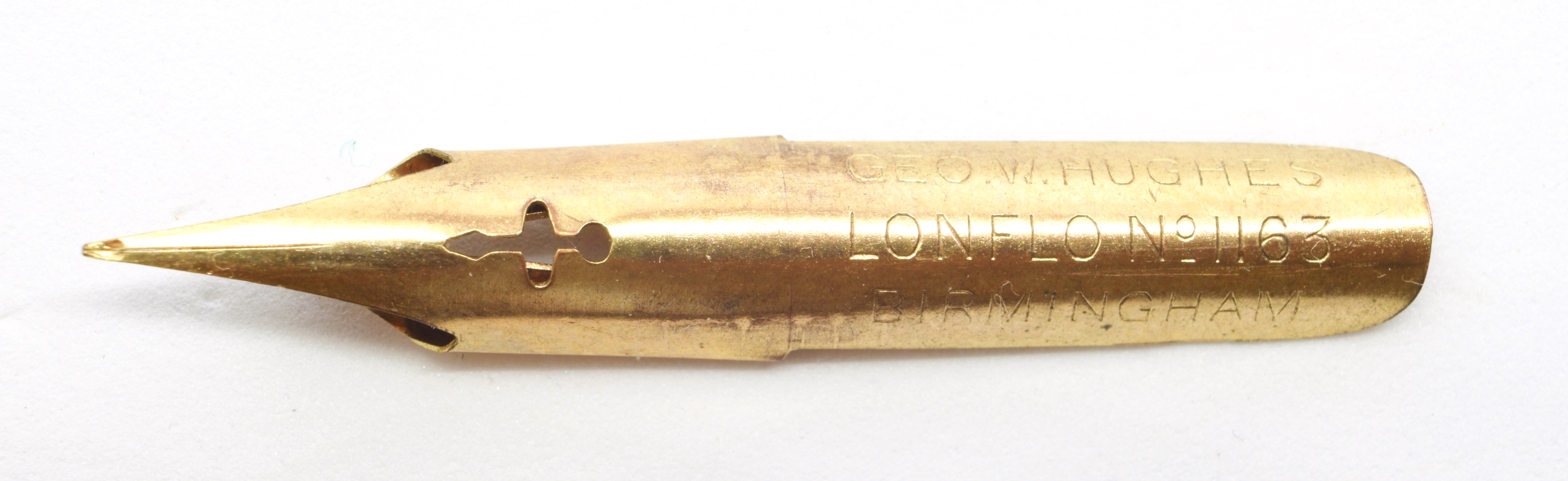
Geo. W. Hughes n° 1163

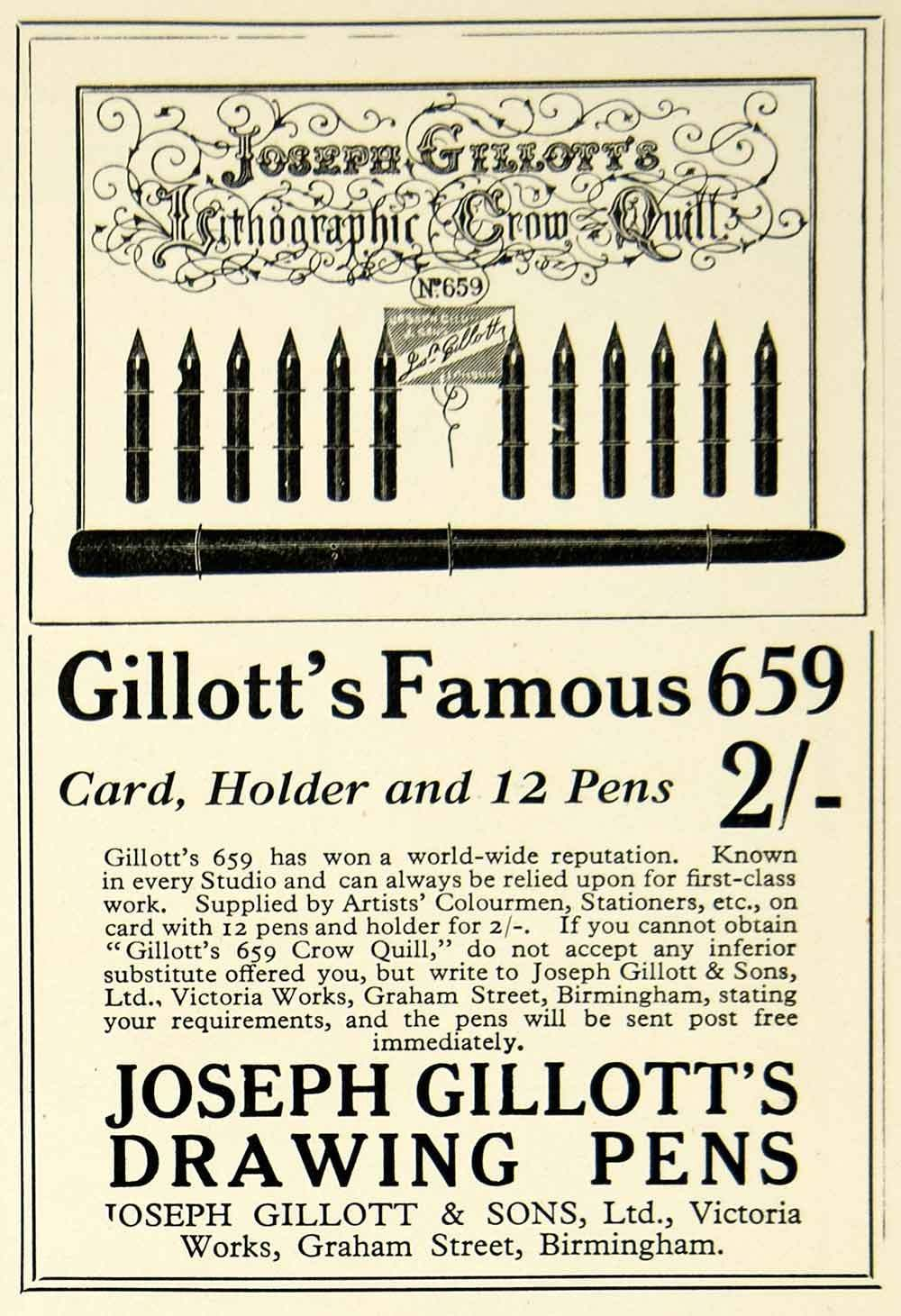
Gillott nibs card

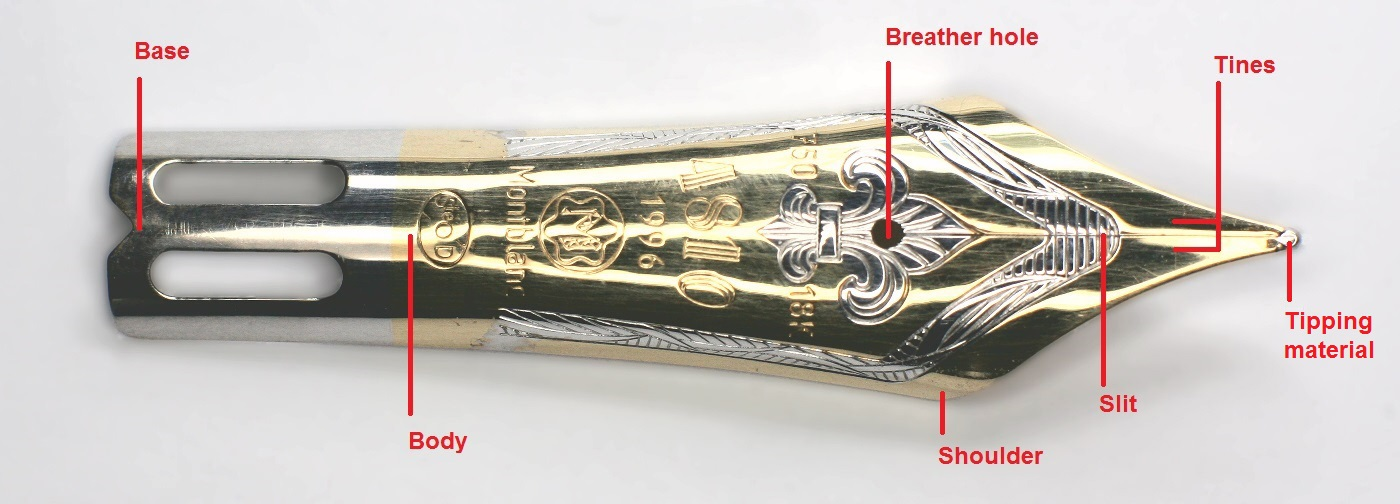
Fountain pen nib anatomy

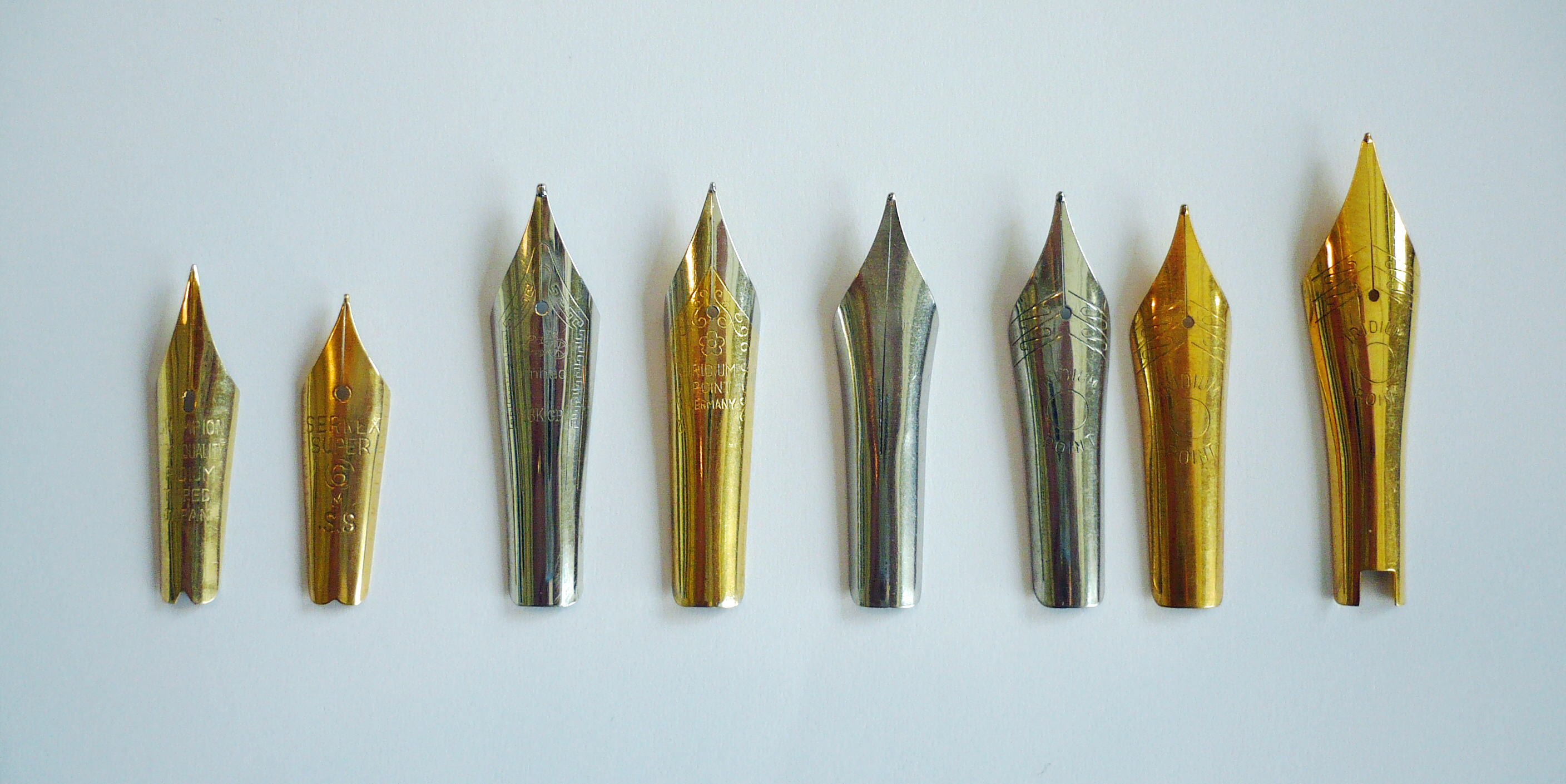
Various fountain pen nibs

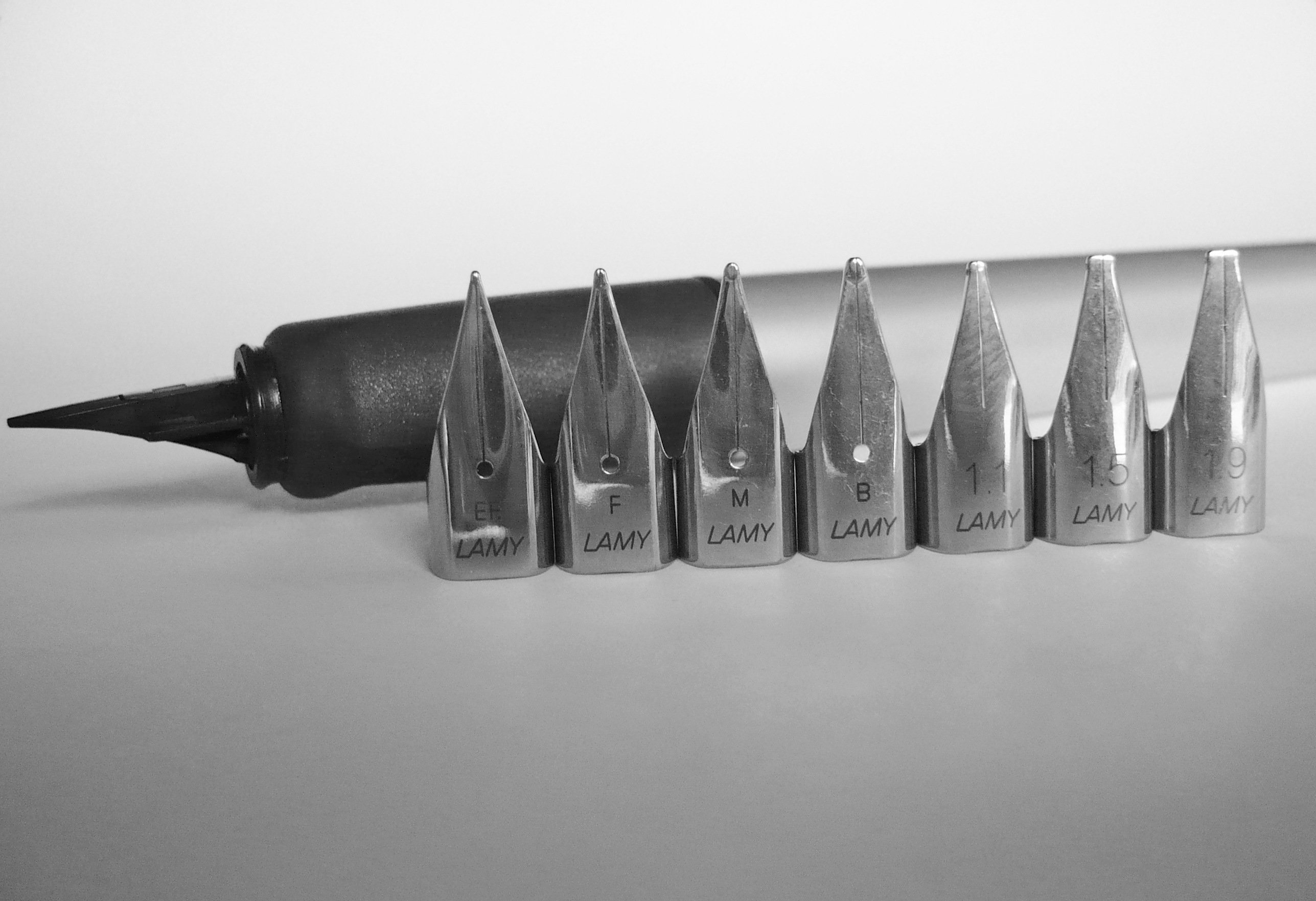
Various line width and style iterations of Lamy Z 50 nibs

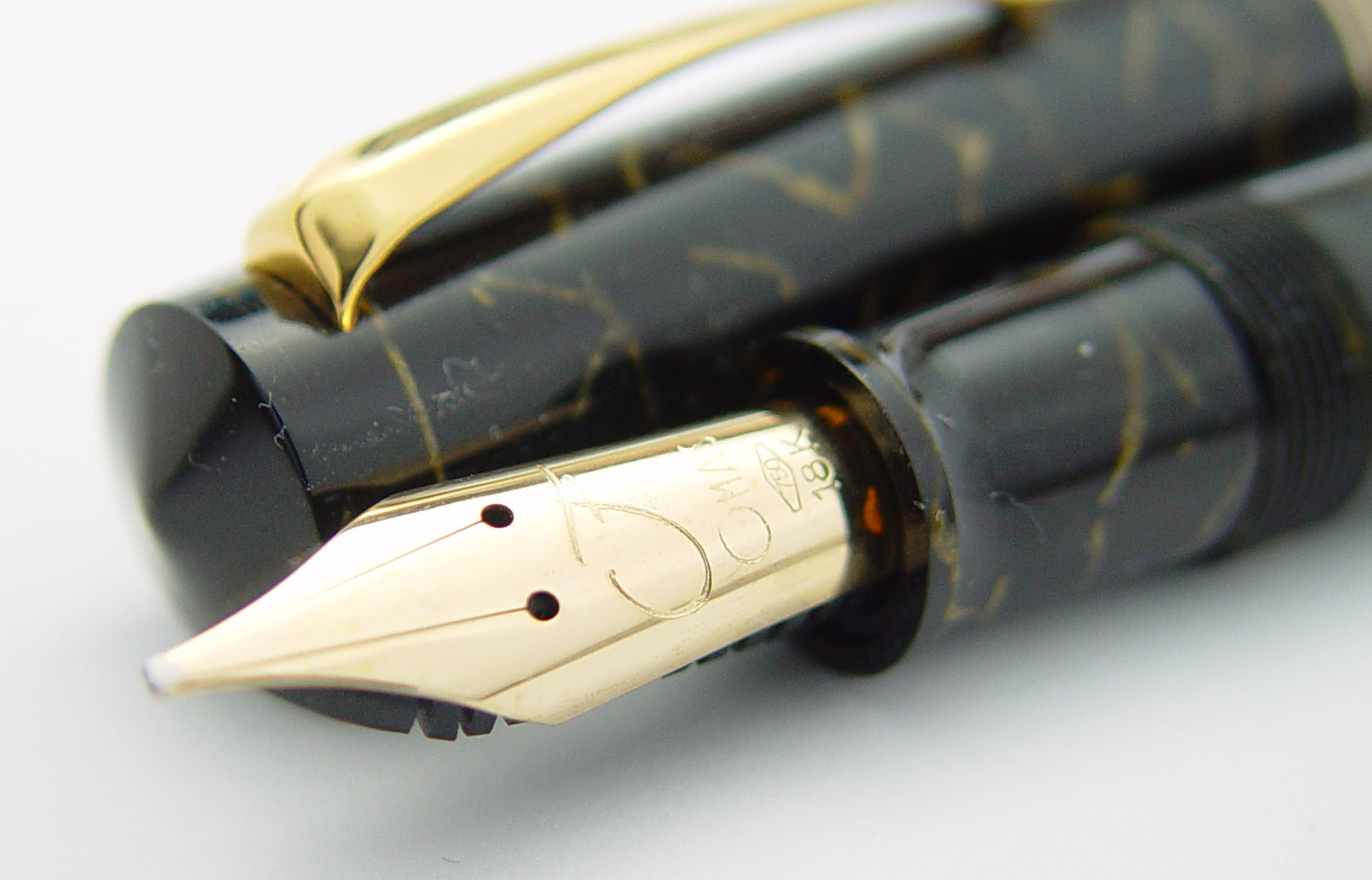
Music nib on an "OMAS Filarmonica" fountain pen

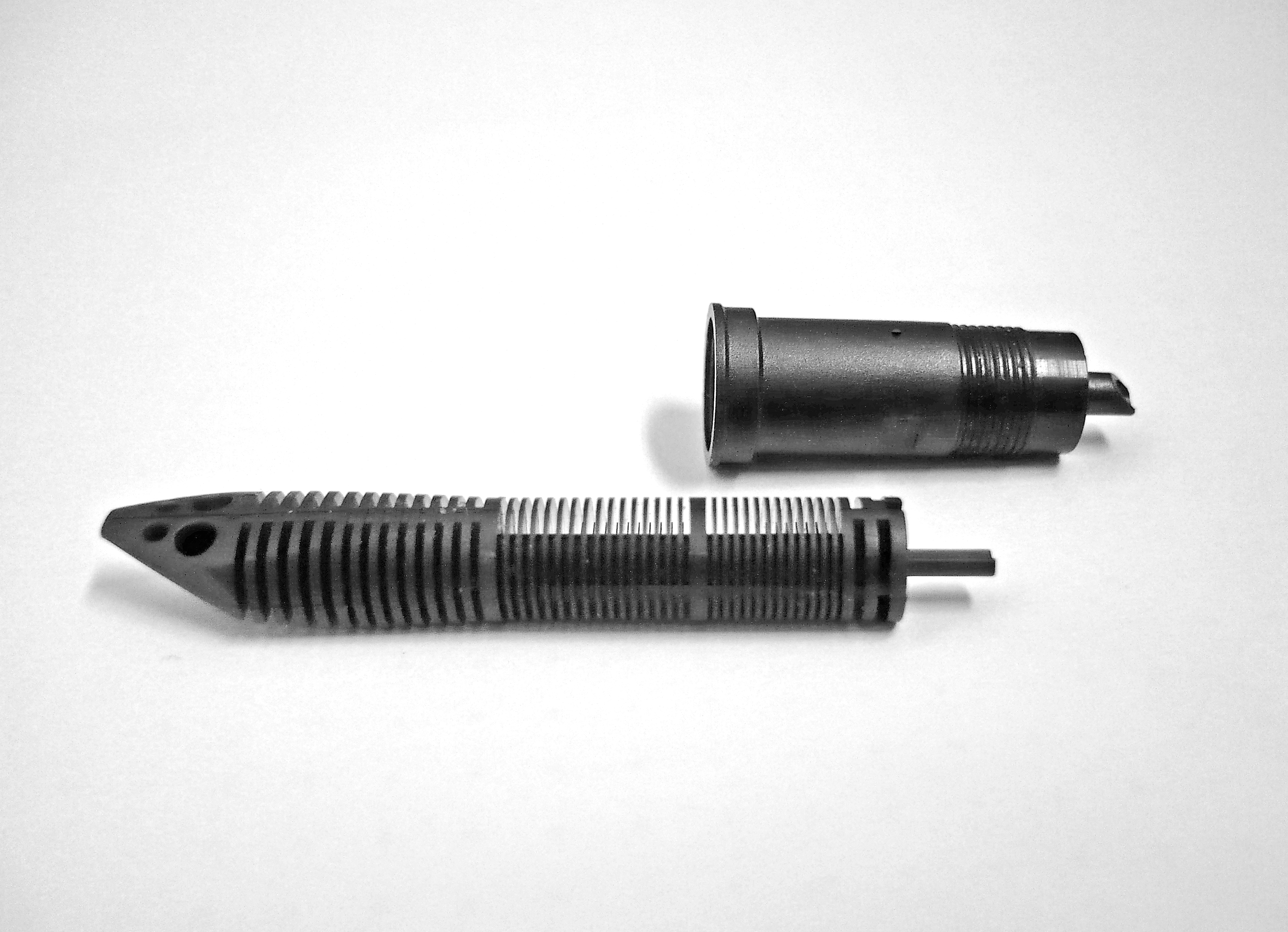
Fountain pen nib unit feed and housing

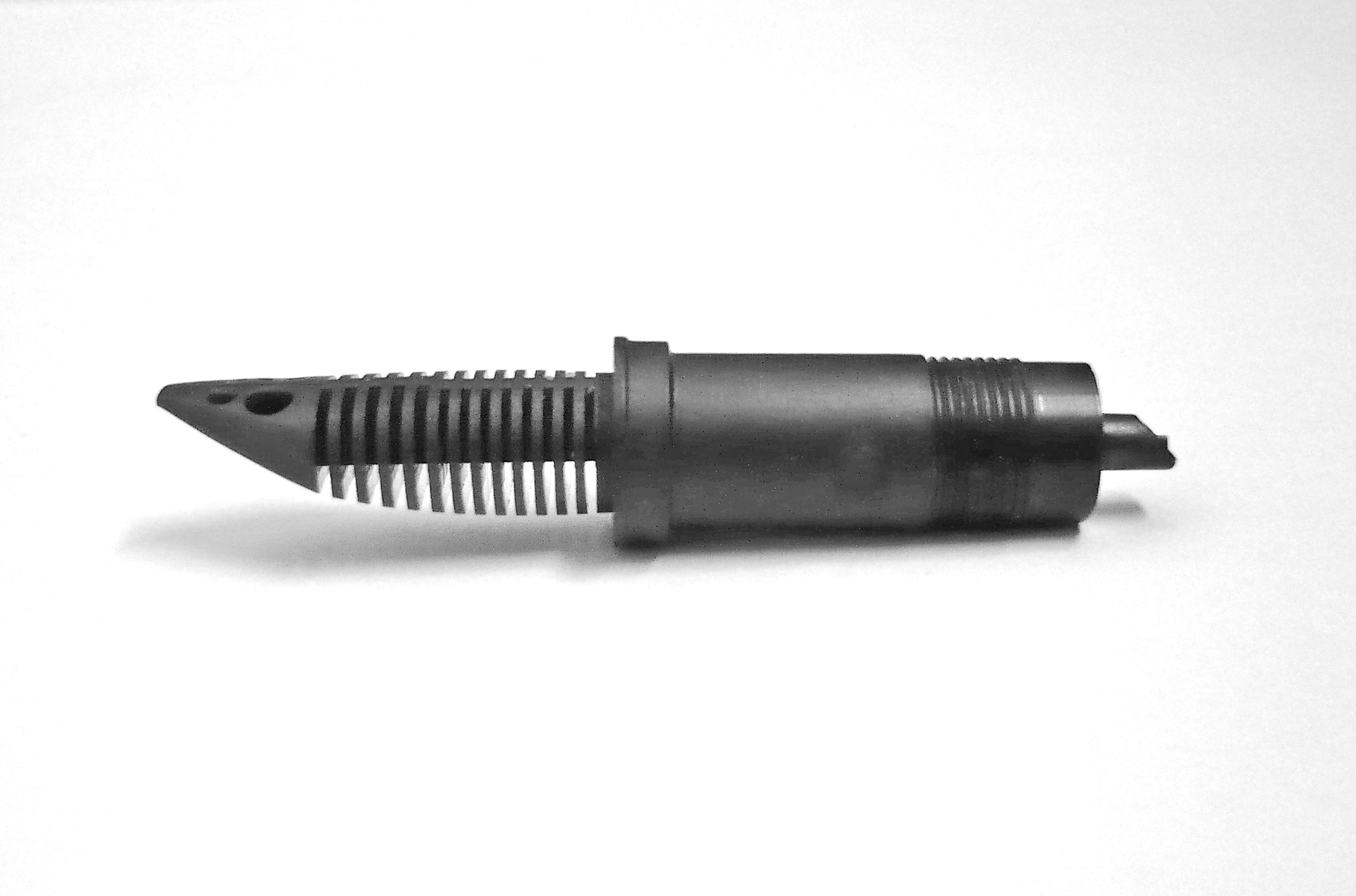
Nib unit prepared for mounting the nib

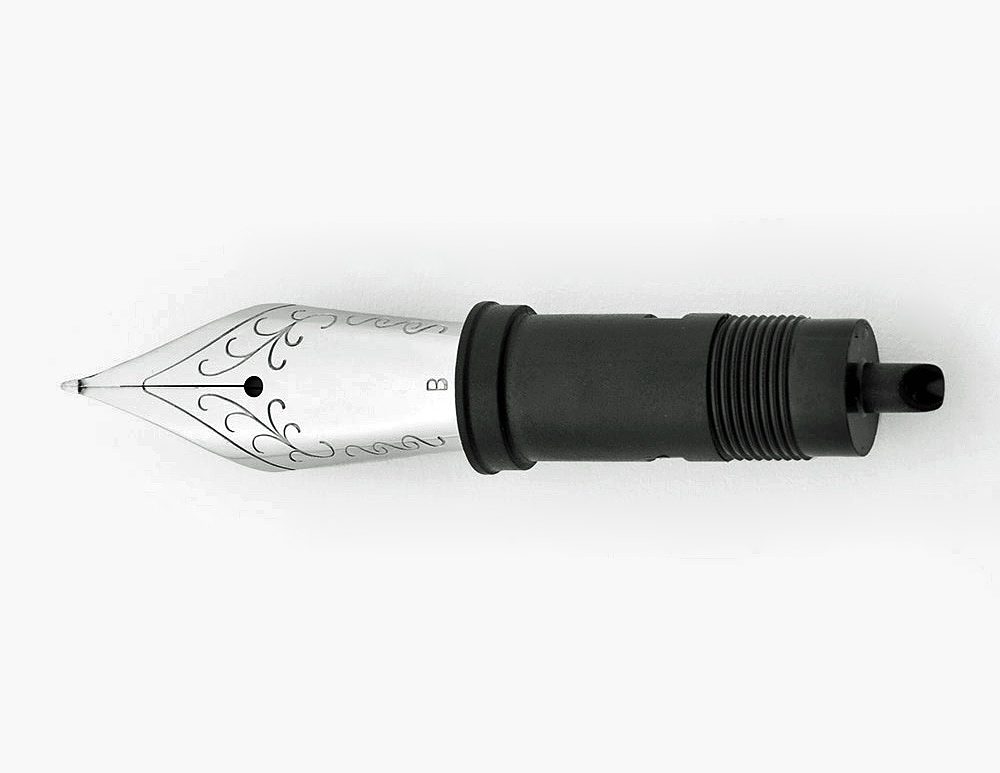
Nib unit fully assembled

== See also ==
- Dip pen
- Birmingham pen trade
- Calligraphy
- List of pen types, brands and companies
