= Melamadai =

- City
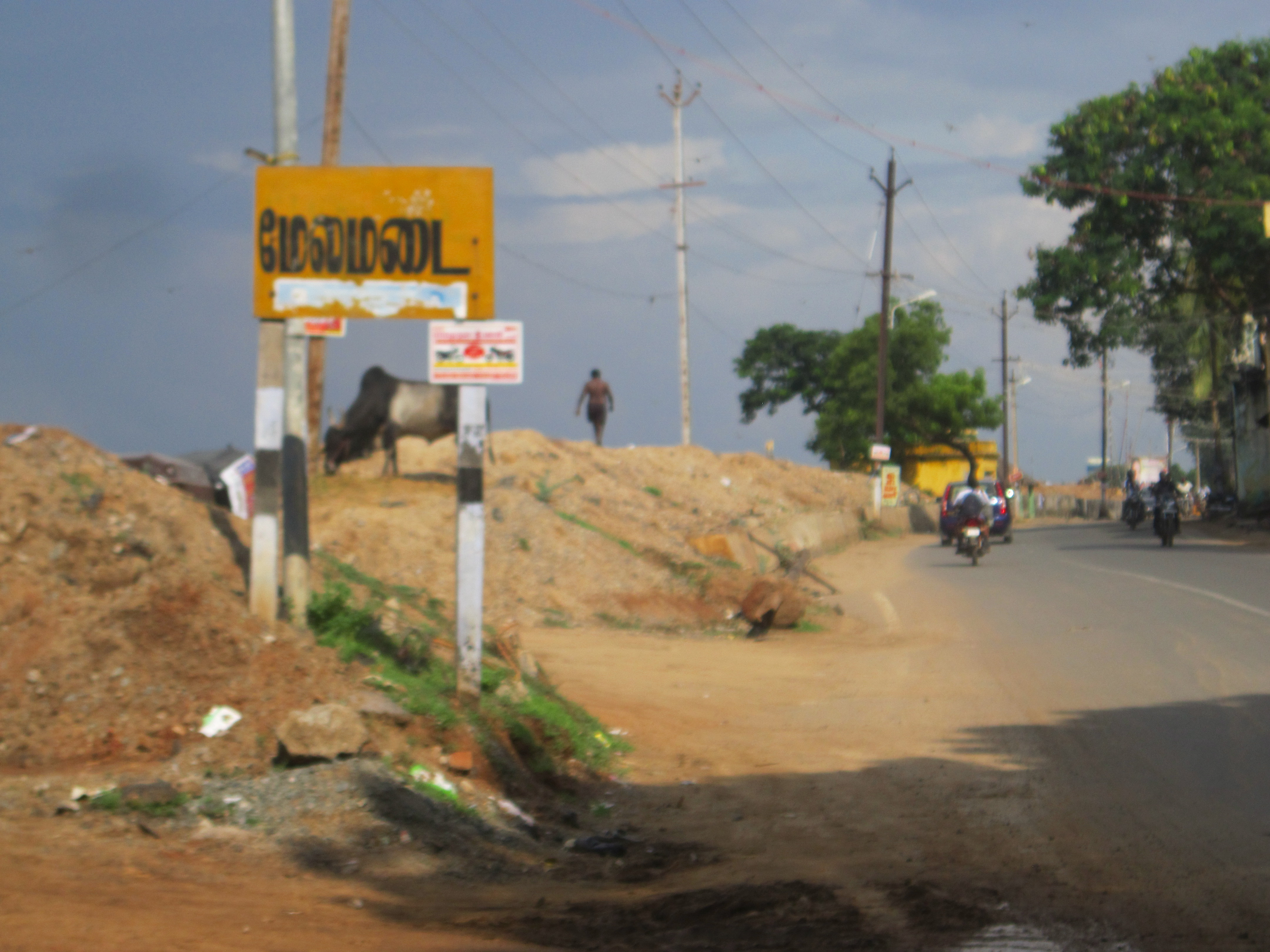

- Location in Tamil Nadu, India
- Coordinates: 9°54′56″N 78°08′44″E
- Country: India
- State: Tamil Nadu
- District: Madurai

Population (2001)
  - Total: 28,885

Languages
  - Official: Tamil
- Time zone: UTC+5:30 (IST)
- Postal code: 625020

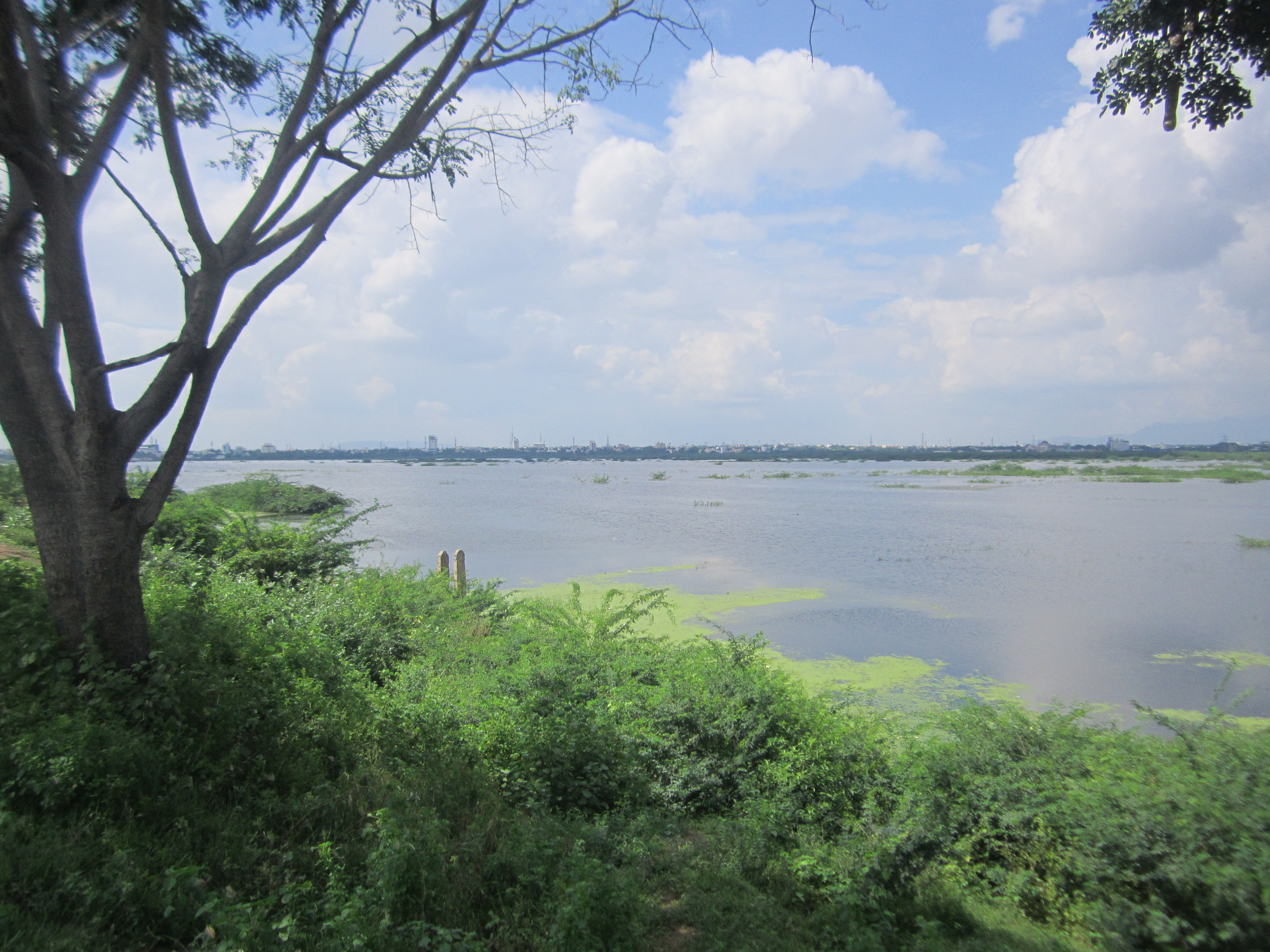
The name 'Madai' in Melamadai is derived from the adjacent lake

Melamadai is 30th ward of Madurai corporation in Madurai district in the Indian state of Tamil Nadu. In 2012 Melamadai included in Madurai Corporation. Vandiyur Lake is located in Melamadai Geographical Area. The famous Pandi temple is located in Melamadai.

== Demographics ==
As of 2001 India census, Melamadai had a population of 28,885. Males constitute 51% of the population and females 49%. Melamadai has an average literacy rate of 78%, higher than the national average of 59.5%: male literacy is 82%, and female literacy is 74%. 10% of the population is under 6 years of age.
