= Vaippar River =

River in Tamil Nadu, India

Coordinates: 9°01′N 78°17′E

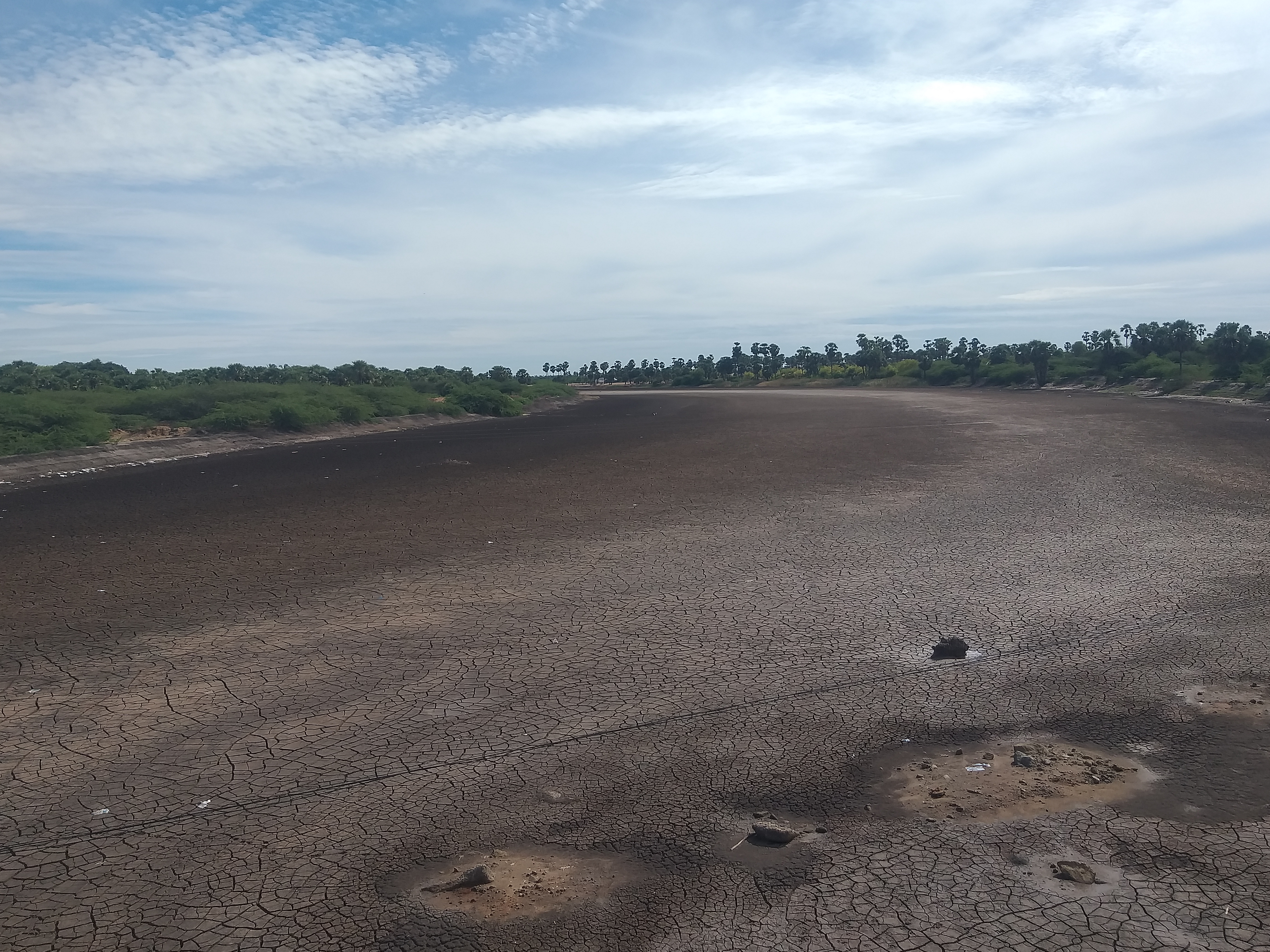
Vaippar River at Vaippar village

Vaippar is a river in the Indian state of Tamil Nadu. It originates from the Varusanadu hills Tenkasi bordering the state of Kerala, runs from Rasingaperi Canal in Sivagiri (Tenkasi) and flows through Virudhunagar and Tuticorin districts before entering the Gulf of Mannar near Sippikulam, 40 kilometres (25 mi).

The Vaippar is 130 kilometres (81 mi) long, with a drainage basin 5,288 square kilometres (2,042 sq mi).

The river basin is located on South of Vagai river. The Arjuna river joins with Vaippar river at Irukkangudi where famous Mariamman temple is located. The Vaippar river has a reservoir at Vembakottai dam.The river also has a reservoir at Irukkangudi dam.

The Vaippar River is used for agriculture throughout its length and is mainly used for making salt in the Tuticorin district.

The Vaippar has many dams including Vembakottai dam, Irrukkankudi dam etc., The Vaippar river flows through the following cities - Vembakottai (Virudhunagar district), Sattur (Virudhunagar district), Villathikulam (Tuticorin district).

During Pongal festival, people celebrate an event called manal medu thiruvila (மணல் மேடுத் திருவிழா) in Sattur, near the river.
