= Raytheon Lectron =

Educational toy

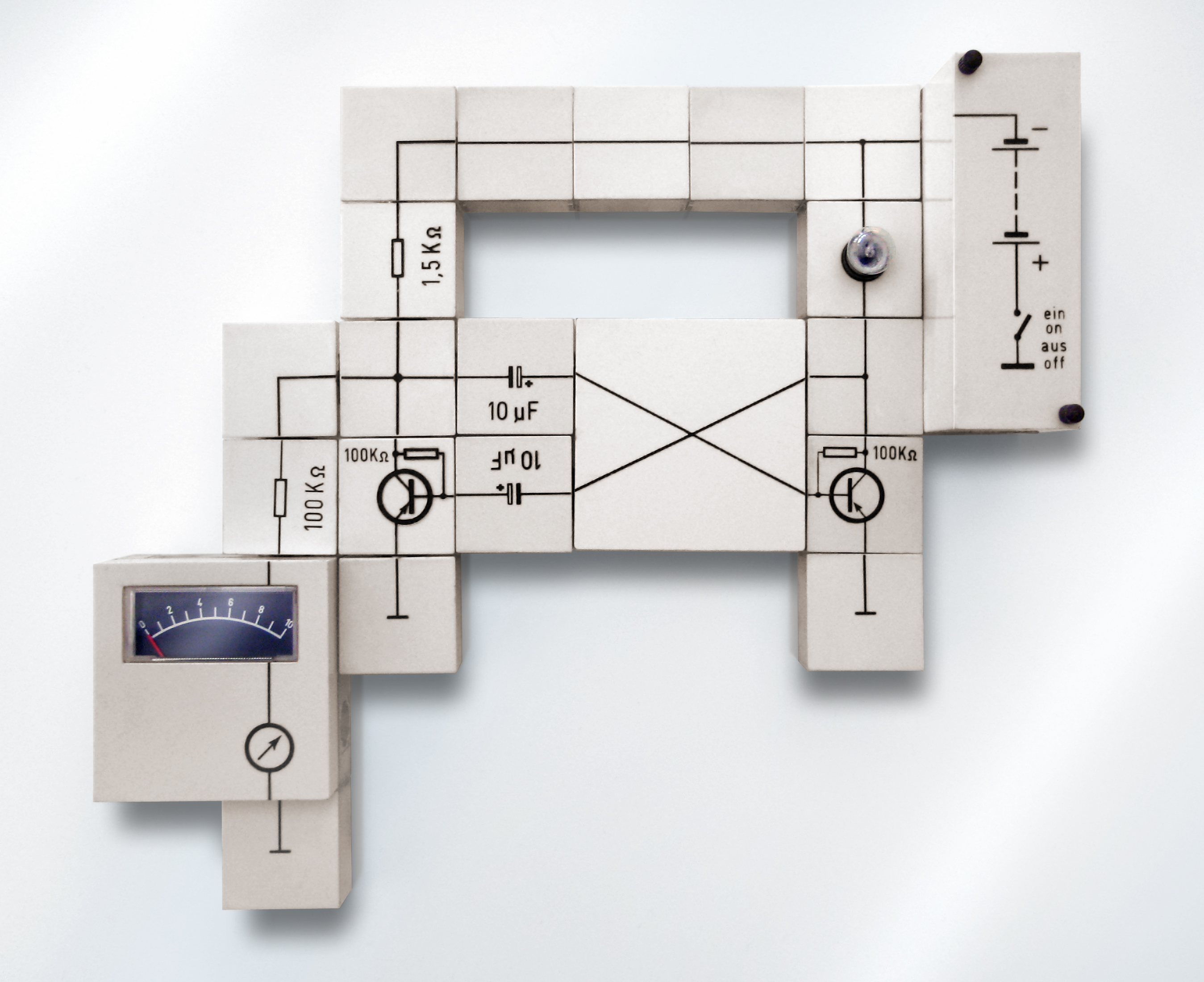
Circuit using Lectron blocks

Lectron was a modular electronic experimentation kit designed to introduce youth to basic electronic circuits and theory.

== Description ==
The Lectron kit consisted of electronic components installed within individual "building blocks" with a clear plastic base, an opaque white top with the component's schematic symbol and permanent magnets attached to the leads of the enclosed components. Each building block was magnetically attached to a metal plate serving both as a work surface and ground, eliminating the need for soldering, spring terminals or a breadboard. This gave the benefit of safety as well as the ability to rearrange the blocks to determine the effect on the circuit.

The instruction manual gave instruction on the proper arrangement of the blocks as well as the function of each individual component's contribution to the final circuit. Experiments began with simple circuits such as a basic electric lamp circuit with switch and worked its way to a three-transistor radio with loudspeaker.

The Raytheon models have not been officially sold in the US since 1969. The Lectron product was manufactured in Frankfurt, Germany and was available for sale with shipping world wide until 2021.

== History ==
=== Europe ===
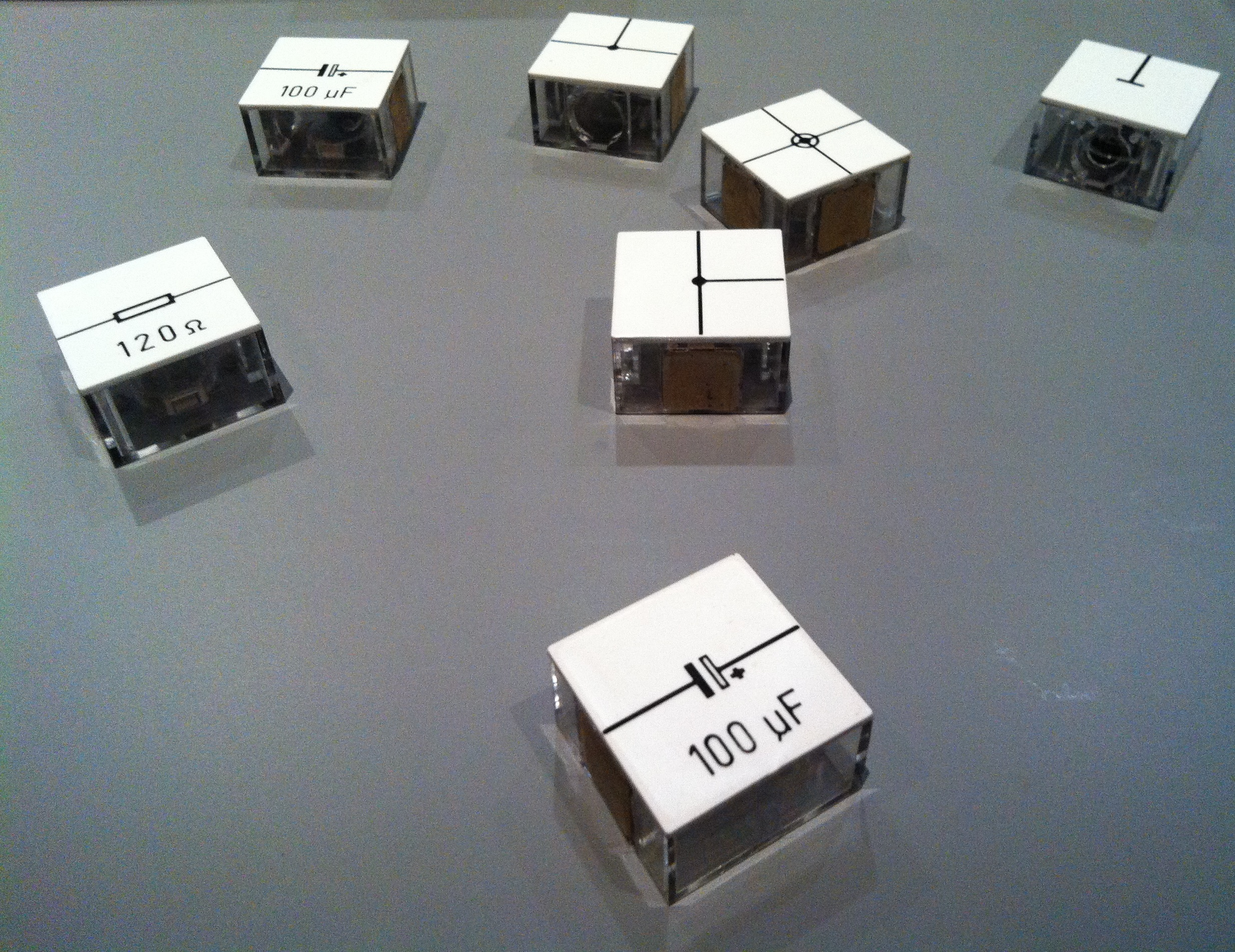
Braun Lectron Elements; Exhibition Systems design : The Ulm school at Museu del Disseny (DHUB) in Barcelona; September 21, 2011 – May 20, 2012

The Lectron electronic blocks system and product was the exclusive and unique invention of Georg Greger in the early 1960s. He applied for a patent of his Electronik-baukasten (electronic building blocks) on May 7, 1965. He was issued a German patent #1228081 on May 18, 1967, and the American patent #3,447,249 was issued on June 3, 1969. The American patent filing of May 5, 1966 is particularly interesting because it includes additional drawings (e.g. the speaker and deluxe base plate) which the German patent did not have. There is also quite a bit more detail on how everything works.

The Lectron was introduced in the German market by model train manufacturer Egger-Bahn. In 1967 Egger Bahn dissolved, and the Lectron product was moved to Deutsche Lectron GmbH, which became the sole manufacturer until 1972. Deutsche Lectron GmbH licensed the system worldwide to Braun, except for North America. In the United States, the Macalaster Scientific subsidiary of Raytheon became the licensee.

In 1967, Braun acquired the original Egger-Bahn line from Deutsche Lectron GmbH. While the basic block design and the styrofoam storage case were retained, Dieter Rams and his team produced new outer packaging and a complete redesign of all manuals. They also supervised all expansions during the Braun era. Dietrich Lubs, designer of the iconic "round button" pocket calculator ET66, created the symbols for several new Demonstrations-System elements (classroom system using oversize blocks) like the logic gates of box 1300.

In 1972, Braun spun off the Lectron business and joined it with Deutsche Lectron GmbH into Lectron GmbH. Manfred Walter, former head of the Lectron department at Braun, became the sole owner and continued development. In 2001, he donated the business, all stock, and all manufacturing tools to Reha Werkstatt Oberrad, a not-for-profit business creating adequate workplaces for the disabled. RWO continues to develop Lectron up to the present.

From 1967 until 1972, Italian company INELCO (Industria Elettronica Comense SrI, Tavernerio, Como) operated as local distributor for Braun. Beginning in 1972 a set of eight products (Book System plus seven extensions) were sold as Sistema Lectron Serie 2000. From 1968 until 2001 INELCO provided translation for Braun and Lectron GmbH from German into seven languages (Danish, Dutch, English, Finnish, French, Italian and Swedish).

=== North America ===
Raytheon marketed the Lectron in two versions. The first version was called "Electronic Dominoes" and featured two models: the 800 and the 820. The second version, which began in May 1968, was sold as "Lectron" and saw an expansion of the product family to three new sets initially (the 800 and 820 model sets were repurposed as the Series 2 and Series 3 sets, with the packaging completely redesigned). This version included the Series 1 - 5 models and the Add-On Kits 1 - 5 which could be used to upgrade, for example, a Series 1 model into a Series 2 model. The "Electronic Dominoes" moniker was also dropped.

The styrofoam molds were reused from the Egger packaging (although the Raytheon production packaging used white styrofoam instead of black), and the blocks themselves continued to be made in (West) Germany. The Series 3A reached the marketplace later, and offered 64 experiments. Add-On Kits 6 - 7 were added at the same time of the Series 3A's release. Raytheon also marketed a Series 3 model for Creative Playthings of Princeton, NJ which was sold as the 'S822 Lectron SCIII'.
