= Braun (company) =

German consumer products company

Coordinates: 50°10′15″N 8°31′45″E

Braun GmbH

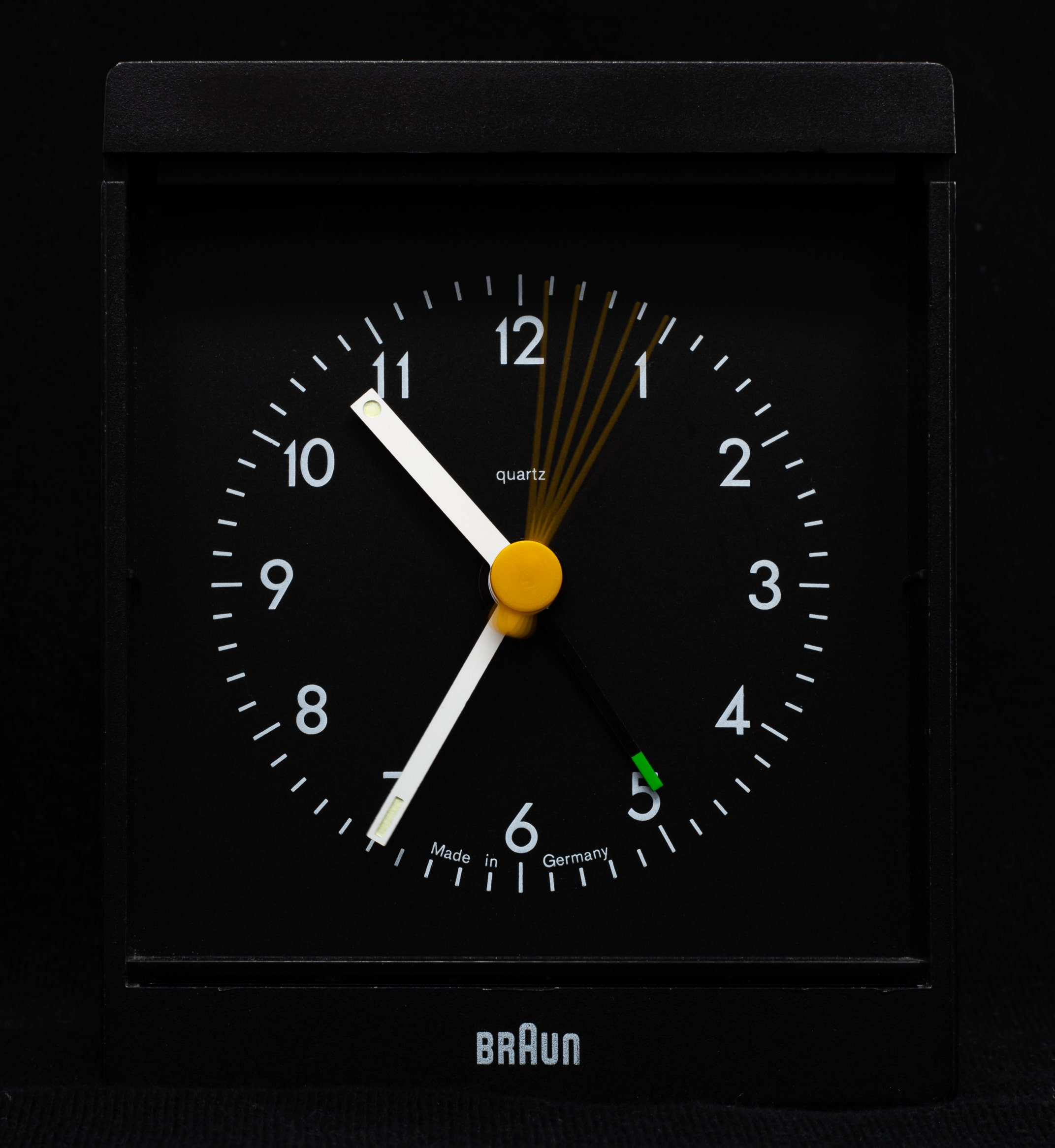
- Braun battery powered travel alarm clock model AB 35 type 4752 (1980s)
- Type: Subsidiary
- Industry: Manufacturing
- Founded: 1921; 105 years ago (as Braun AG) in Frankfurt, Germany
- Founder: Max Braun
- Headquarters: Kronberg im Taunus, Germany
- Area served: Worldwide
- Key people: Ahmed Aboulenein – Ebo, Global Braun Vice President; Oliver Grabes, Head of Design; Dieter Rams, Head of Design (1961–1995)
- Products: Electric razors; IPL (Semi permanent Hair removal) appliances; Epilators; Electric toothbrushes; Watches
- Parent: Procter & Gamble
- Divisions: De'Longhi (small appliances); Kaz Incorporated (thermometers); Zeon Ltd. (clocks, watches, and calculators)
- Website: braun.com

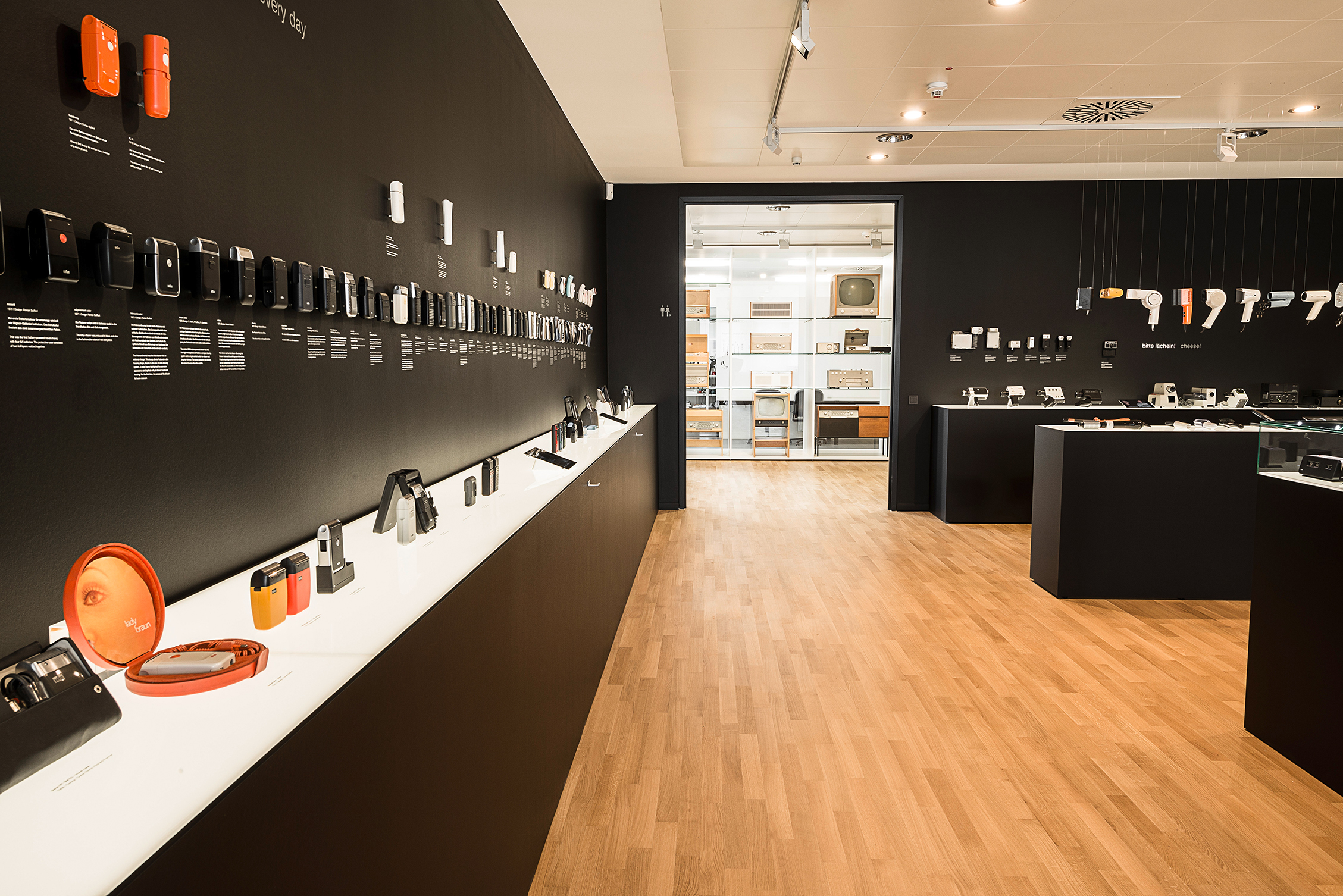
Förderkreis Braun Sammlung museum in Kronberg

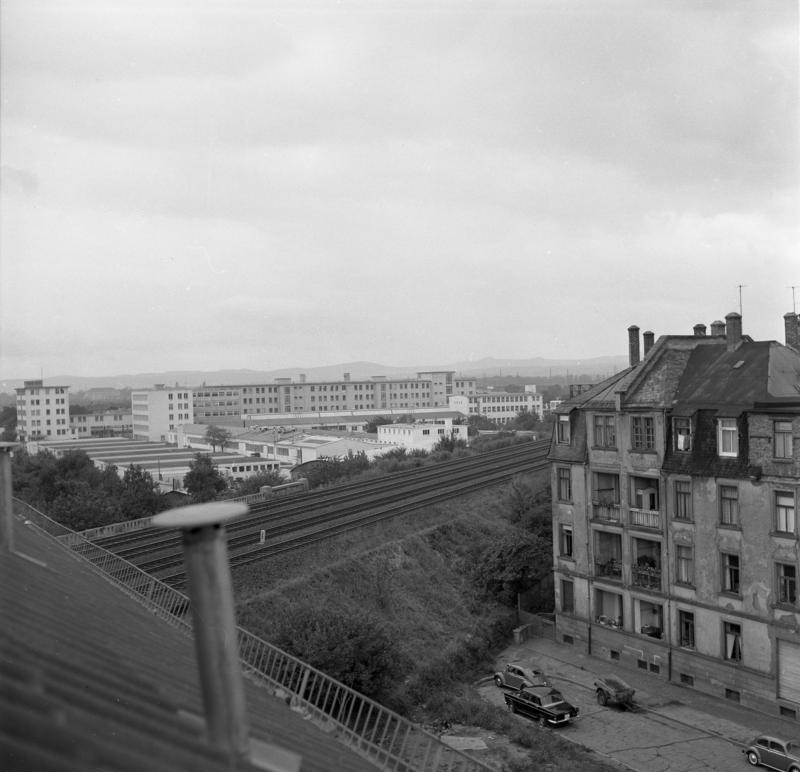
Company headquarters in Frankfurt am Main (1960)

Braun GmbH (/braʊn/ "brown", German: [bʁaʊn]) is a German consumer products company founded in 1921 and based in Kronberg im Taunus, Hesse. Today the company is part of the American multinational consumer goods company Procter & Gamble. It is known for its design aesthetic from the 1960s through the 1980s. It has manufactured a wide assortment of products ranging from electric shavers and personal care devices to radiograms and record players, movie cameras, slide projectors, clocks, and small kitchen appliances, for which "Braun became shorthand for reliable, no-nonsense modernist goods."

== History ==
In 1921, Max Braun (1890–1951), a mechanical engineer, established a small engineering shop in Frankfurt, Germany. In 1923, he began producing components for radio sets. By 1928, the growing company moved to new premises on Idsteiner Strasse.

In 1929, eight years after he started his shop, Max Braun began to manufacture entire radio sets, and his company eventually became one of Germany's leading radio manufacturers. This development continued with the launch of one of the first combined radio and record players, called radiograms, in 1932.

In 1935, the Braun brand was introduced, and the original incarnation of the logotype with the raised "A" was born. At the 1937 World's Fair in Paris, Max Braun received the award for "Special Achievements in Phonography." In support of the war effort during World War II, Braun discontinued making products for the civilian sector. In 1944, the Frankfurt factories were almost destroyed, and Max Braun began to rebuild his company.

After the war, Braun continued to produce state-of-the-art radios and audio equipment, and the company soon became well known for its "high-fidelity" audio and record players, including the famous SK line. Braun was the only foreign licensee of the QUAD electrostatic loudspeaker for a time. In 1954, the company also began producing film slide projectors, a mainstay of its business for the next forty years. By 1956, the company was marketing the first fully automatic tray film slide projector known as the PA 1. (Note: Slide projectors produced by Braun AG must not be confused with the Paximat and Novamat slide projectors produced by Carl Braun Camera-Werk, a different and unrelated German company, up to the present (2014).)

The 1950s also marked the beginning of the product that Braun is known for today: the electric shaver. Braun's first electric shaver, known as the S 50, was designed in 1938, but World War II delayed its introduction until 1951. It featured an oscillating cutter block with a very thin, yet stable, steel foil mounted above it.

The 1950s also saw the start of kitchen appliances, like the mixer MX 3 and the kitchen machine (Küchenmaschine or kitchen machine) Braun KM 3. The KM 3 is a family of food processors that started with the model KM 3/31 in 1957. Designed by Gerd A. Müller, these machines were built in nearly unchanged form for 36 years until 1993.

In 1962, Braun became Braun AG, a publicly traded company. In 1963, the company started distributing microphones by U.S. manufacturer Shure in Germany. Also during the 1960s, Braun created the Rams-designed T3 pocket radio. By this time, Braun's film-slide projectors incorporated high-quality optics, all-metal construction, and functionalist design, allowing them to compete with higher-end Eastman Kodak and Leitz products on the global market. Braun also became the German distributor for Zenza Bronica's high-end medium-format Single-lens reflex cameras and continued to market cameras under the Braun-Nizo brand, including Super 8 film cameras formerly produced by Niezoldi & Krämer GmbH, which Braun had acquired in 1962. In 1967, the Boston, Massachusetts-based conglomerate Gillette Group acquired a majority share of the company.

Erwin Braun, one of Max Braun's sons, took on the sales agency of the LECTRON system product line in 1967. He was very interested in making the teaching of electronics approachable to students all over the world. The LECTRON system was a simple but ingenious product that fit the bill perfectly. The LECTRON System was introduced to the German marketplace in 1966 by Egger-Bahn (a company primarily focused on the 9 mm toy train sector). An electronic component, such as a resistor, was placed inside a transparent flat cube with a white cover on the top, which had the electronic symbol and its value. The blocks containing different components and types of connections could be put together to form a working circuit with the circuit schematic diagram illustrated by the symbols on the top of the block. The blocks were held together with magnets behind the conductive plates on the sides and bottom of the block. In 1972, due to pressure from Gillette, the LECTRON assets were sold off to Manfred Walter, the manager of the LECTRON product line at Braun. Mr. Walter formed Lectron, GmbH, in 1972 to continue selling and developing the LECTRON product line. Mr. Walter retired and gifted the LECTRON assets to the Reha-Werkstatt Oberrad in 2001. The RWO continues to manufacture and sell the LECTRON system to this day.

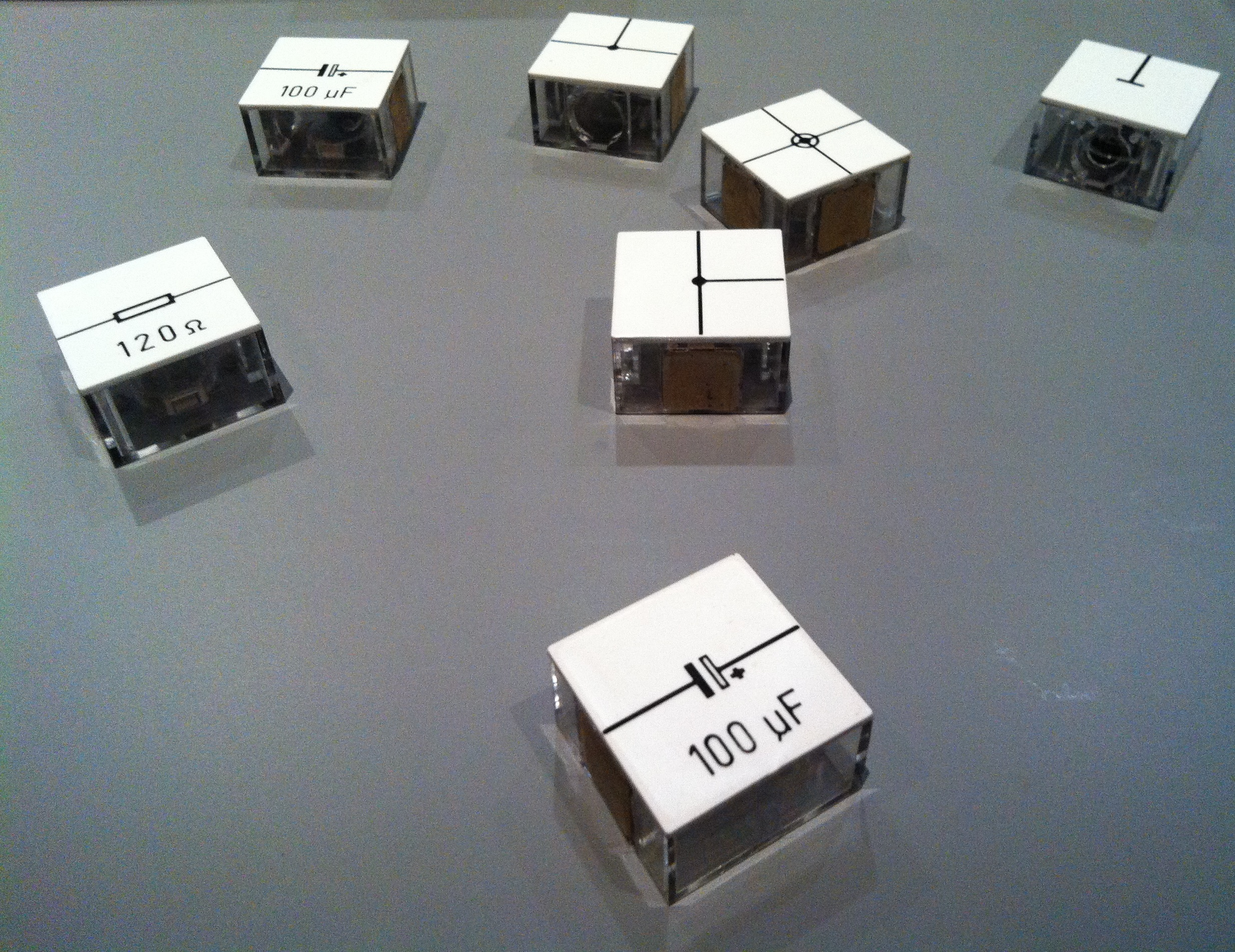
Braun Lectron elements (Design Museum of Barcelona)

By the 1970s, Braun discontinued its film slide projectors and hi-fi products to focus on consumer appliances such as shavers, razors, coffee makers, clocks, and radios. In 1981, the company's audio and hi-fidelity division, which grew out of Braun's former core business of radios, turntables, and hi-fidelity audio products, was spun off into Braun Electronic GmbH, a legally independent Gillette subsidiary. Braun Electronic GmbH put out its last audio-fi set in 1990 before the business was discontinued. Also, in the early 1980s, Braun sold its photographic and slide projector division to Robert Bosch GmbH.

In 1982, the Gillette Group moved to integrate Braun with the parent company by taking full control over its operations. In 1984, Braun ceased the production of cigarette lighters. That same year, Braun became a wholly owned subsidiary of Gillette.

By the mid-1990s, Braun held a leading position among the world's home appliance manufacturers, but profitability concerns began to surface. Many of Braun's competitors closely imitated Braun designs and had them produced in low-cost labor countries at lower costs. The litigation commenced by the company to reverse the sales losses and damage to its product image cost Braun substantial amounts of money.

In 1998, Gillette decided to transform Braun AG into a private company before it bought back a 19.9 percent share in its subsidiary The Gillette Company Inc., which Braun had acquired in 1988. The following year, Braun's sales organization was merged with those of Gillette's other business divisions to cut costs. At the end of the 1990s, Braun and Gillette suffered losses in several areas. Looking for ways to return to profitability, Gillette considered the disposal of some of Braun's less profitable divisions, such as kitchen appliances and thermometers, but abandoned the idea a few months later when no buyers were found. Braun's sales in those areas began to recover in 2000.

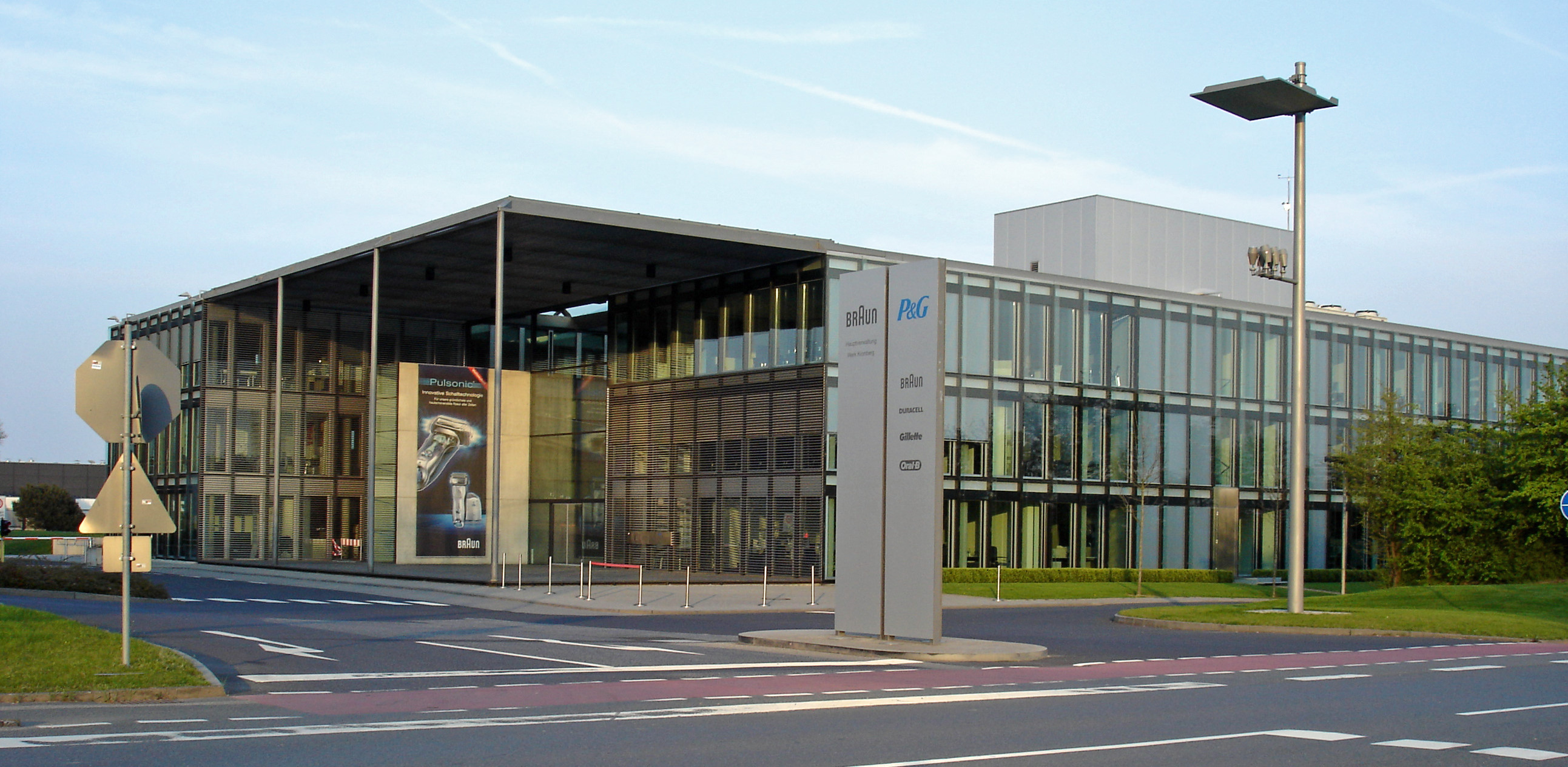
Braun headquarters in Kronberg

Gillette was acquired by Procter & Gamble in 2005, making Braun a wholly owned subsidiary of P&G. In 2006 Procter & Gamble sold Braun's Health Products division to Kaz, now a subsidiary of Helen of Troy Limited, along with licensing the use of Braun's trademark in the specific health products market. In early 2008, P&G discontinued sales of Braun appliances, except certain appliances such as shavers and electric toothbrushes, in the United States market. Elsewhere, however, Braun kept selling all its core categories until 2012, when the Braun product line relating to kitchen appliances was purchased by De'Longhi, using the Braun trademark under license from P&G.

== Products ==
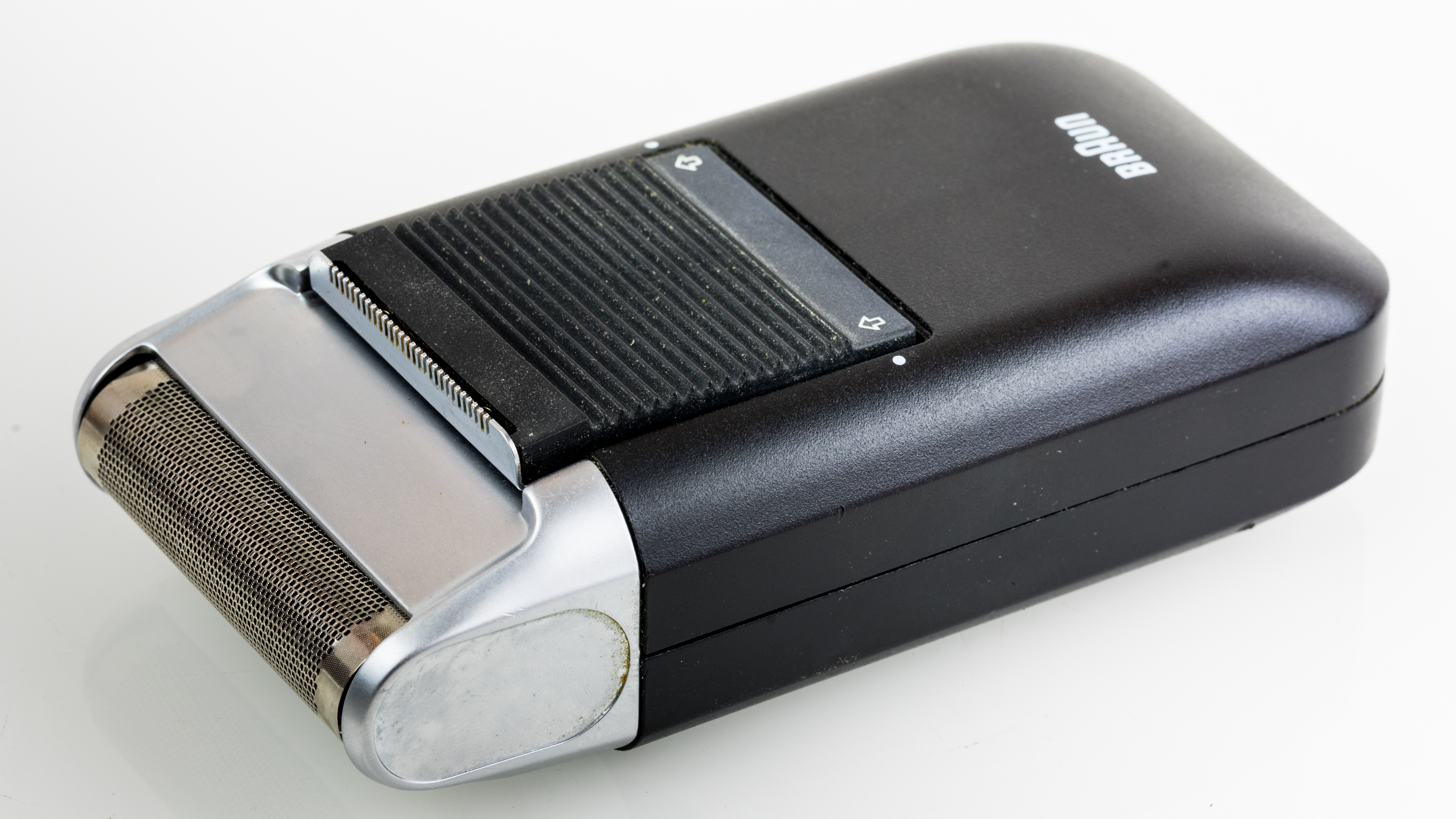
Micron model 5410 shaver (1977)

Braun's products include the following categories:

- Shaving and grooming (electric shaving, hair trimming, beard trimming)
- Oral care (now under the Oral-B brand)
- Beauty care (hair care and epilation)
- Health and wellness (ear thermometers, blood pressure monitors) (out-licensed)
- Food and drink preparation (coffee makers, coffee grinders, toasters, blenders, juicers) (out-licensed)
- Irons (out-licensed)
- Clocks, watches, and calculators (out-licensed)

The company was formerly a manufacturer of food processors, radios, slide projectors, Super 8 film cameras and accessories, and high-fidelity sound systems.

Today, Braun focuses on its core categories (shaving and grooming, beauty, and hair care). Small household appliances, health and wellness categories, as well as clocks and watches are now manufactured by other companies (De'Longhi, Zeon, Kaz) under license.

== Design department ==
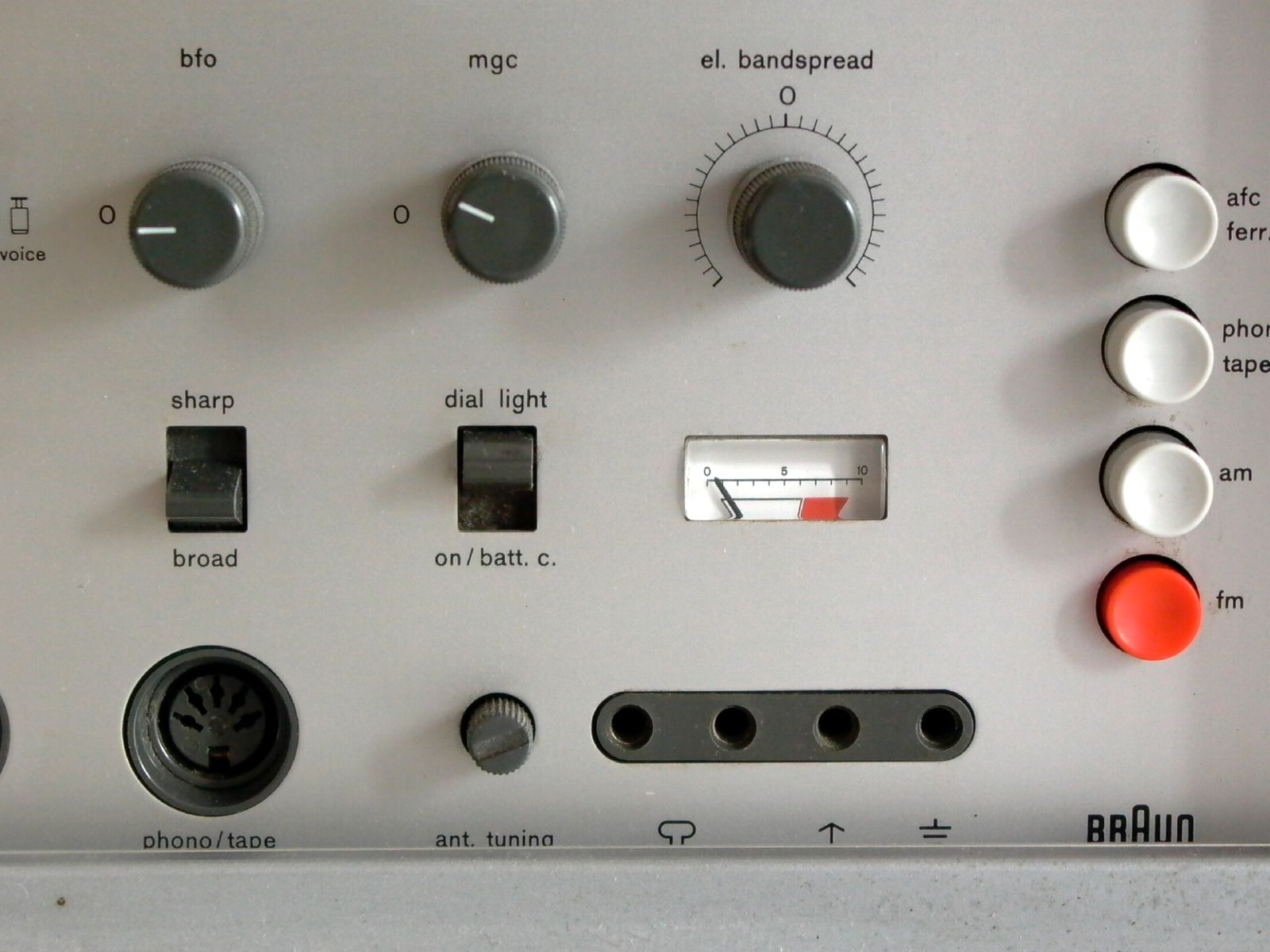
Detail of model T 1000 CD multiband radio receiver (mid 1960s)

From the mid-1950s, the Braun brand was closely linked with the concept of German modern industrial design and its combination of functionality and technology. In 1956, Braun created its first design department, headed by Fritz Eichler, who instituted a collaboration with the Ulm School of Design to develop a new product line. In 1956 the company introduced its famous SK 4 radiogram ("Snow White's Coffin"), designed by a youthful Dieter Rams together with Herbert Lindinger and the pioneer of system design, Hans Gugelot, then lecturer of design at the Ulm School of Design. Rams soon became the most influential designer at Braun and was a key figure in the German design renaissance of the late 1950s and 1960s. Eventually becoming head of Braun's design staff, Rams' influence was soon evidenced in many products. Braun's audio equipment and the high-quality "D"-series (D25–D47) 35 mm slide projectors from this period are some better examples of Functionalist design.

Another icon of modern design, but less well known, is the LE1 electrostatic loudspeaker unit (for which technological aspects were licensed from the British company QUAD). Dieter Rams and Dietrich Lubs are also responsible for the classic range of Braun alarm clocks, collaborating first on the design of Phase I, Phase II, and Phase III in the early 1970s. They later collaborated on the AB 20 in 1975, followed by a number of other models. These designs were discontinued by Braun in 2005.

In the 1970s, a design approach influenced by pop art began to inspire Braun products, which included many common household appliances and products. Contemporary Braun design of the period incorporated this new approach in bright colors and a lightness of touch while still being clean-lined in keeping with functionalist philosophy.

For nearly 30 years, Dieter Rams served as head of design for Braun A.G. until his retirement in 1995, when Peter Schneider succeeded him. Other designers who worked in Braun's design department include Gerd Alfred Muller, Reinhold Weiss, Richard Fischer, Robert Oberheim, Florian Seiffert, Hartwig Kahlcke, Herbert Hirche, Fritz Eichler (designer), Roland Ullmann, and Ludwig Littmann. Many of the designs that Rams and the Braun design department produced are held in the collections of museums around the world, including the Museum of Modern Art in New York, the Pompidou Centre in Paris, and the Museum für Angewandte Kunst in Frankfurt.

The work of the Braun design department, and especially the Ten Principles for Good design as defined by Rams, influenced both Steve Jobs and Apple designer Jonathan Ive.

The designer Jasper Morrison has spoken about his grandfather's "Snow White's Coffin" being an "important influence on [his] choice in becoming a designer."

More recent collaborations that highlight the ongoing influence of the work of the Braun design department have included projects such as Braun wristwatches designed by Paul Smith and Virgil Abloh's re-working of the classic BC02 alarm clock for his Off-White brand, which sought to "open up the conversation on the role of design today."

== Gallery ==
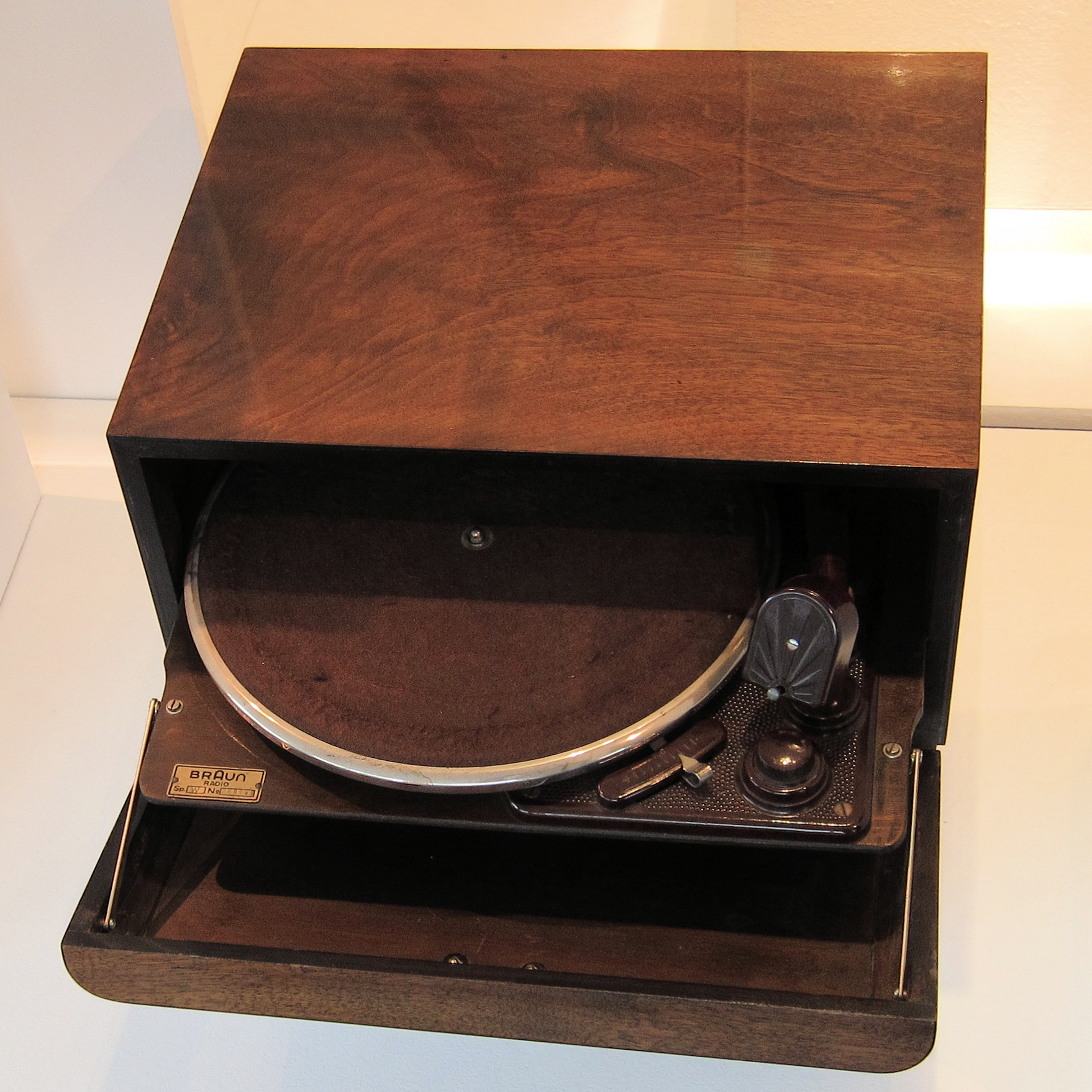
Cosmophon phonograph (c. 1937) (Note: Designed by Max Braun et al.)

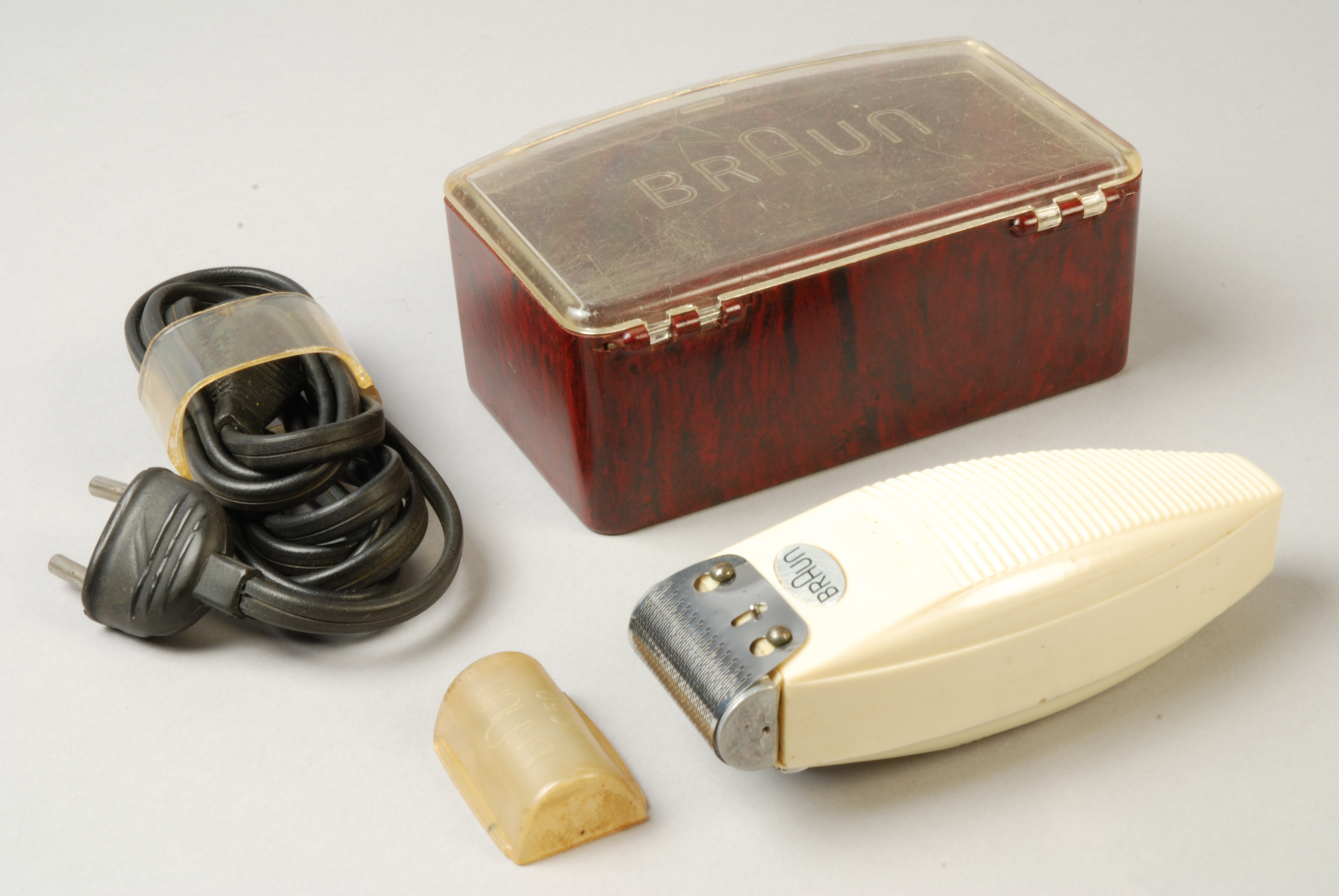
Model S 50 electric shaver (1950)

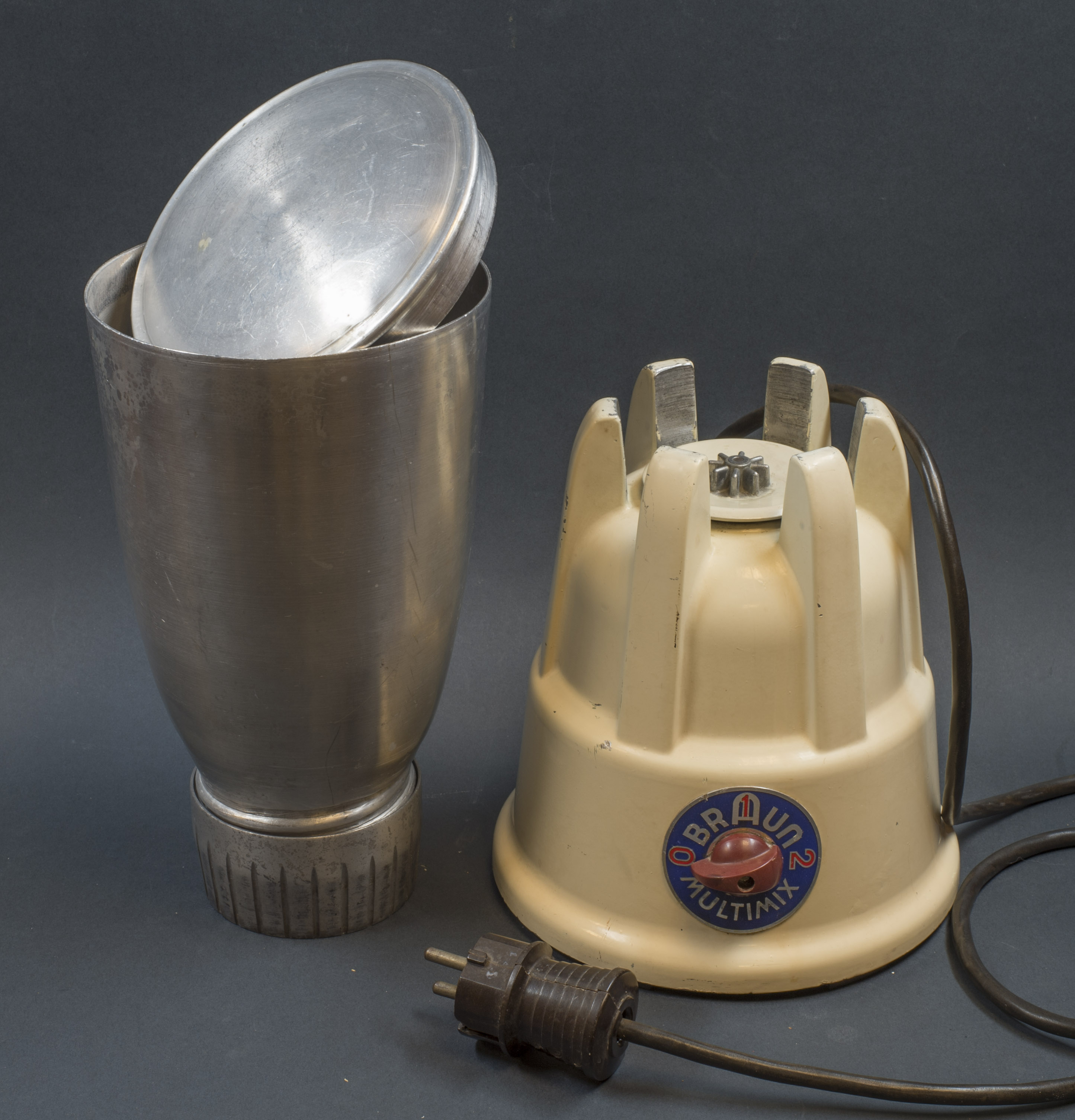
Multimix blender (early 1950s)

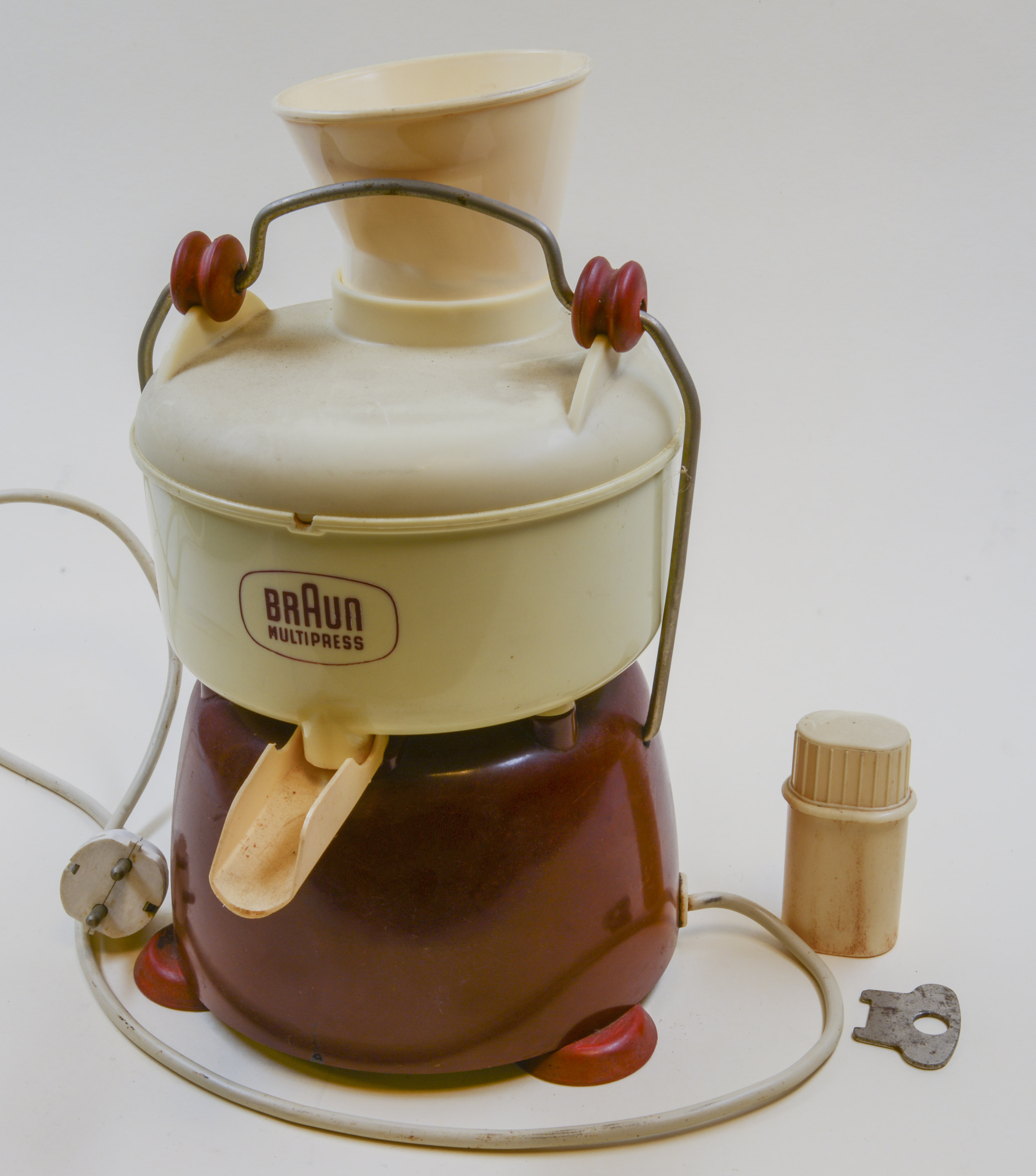
Multipress juicer (1950s)

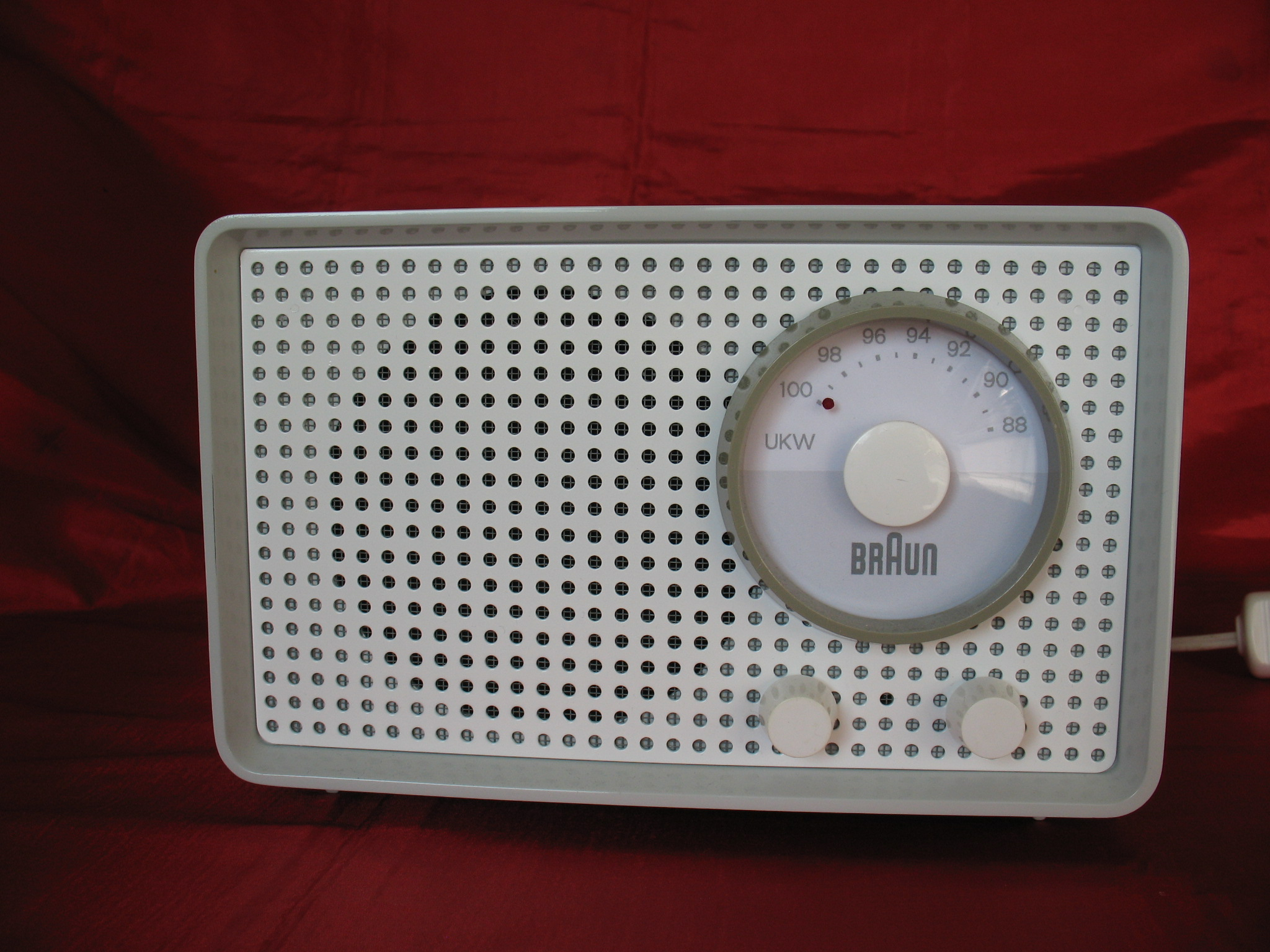
Model SK 1 radio receiver (1955)

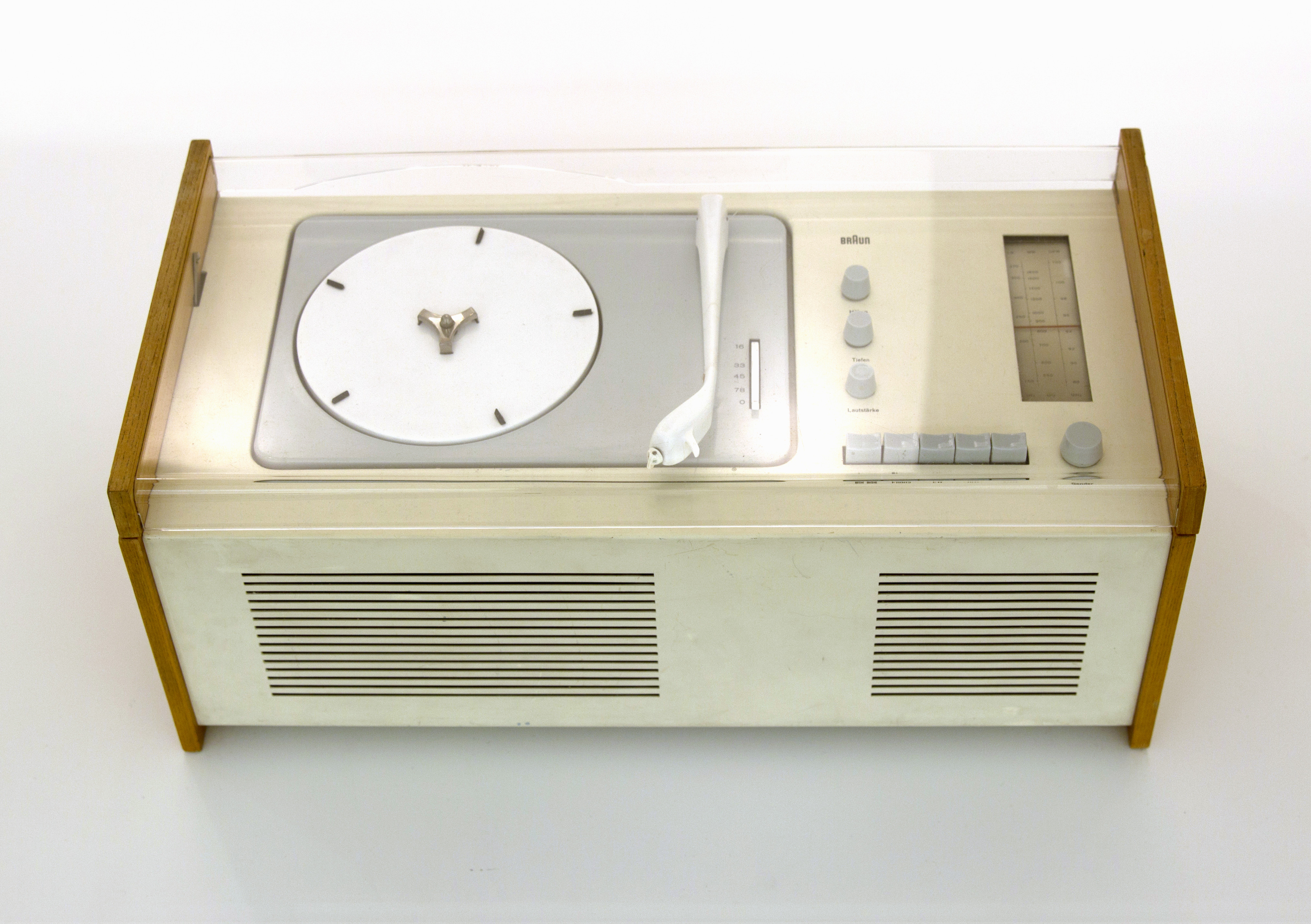
Model SK 4 "Snow White's coffin" radiogram (1956) (Note: Designed by Dieter Rams and Hans Gugelot)

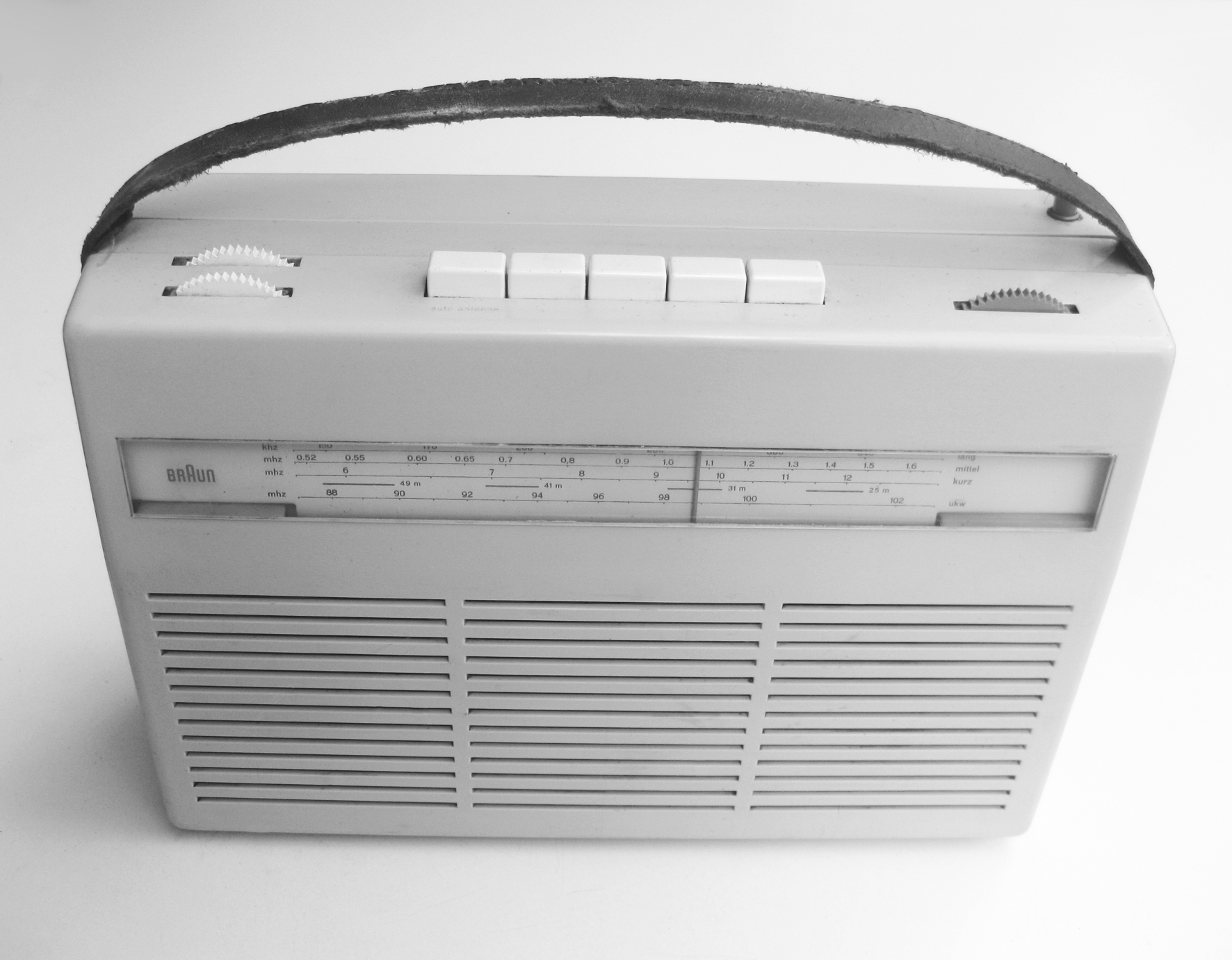
Transistor 1 radio (1957)

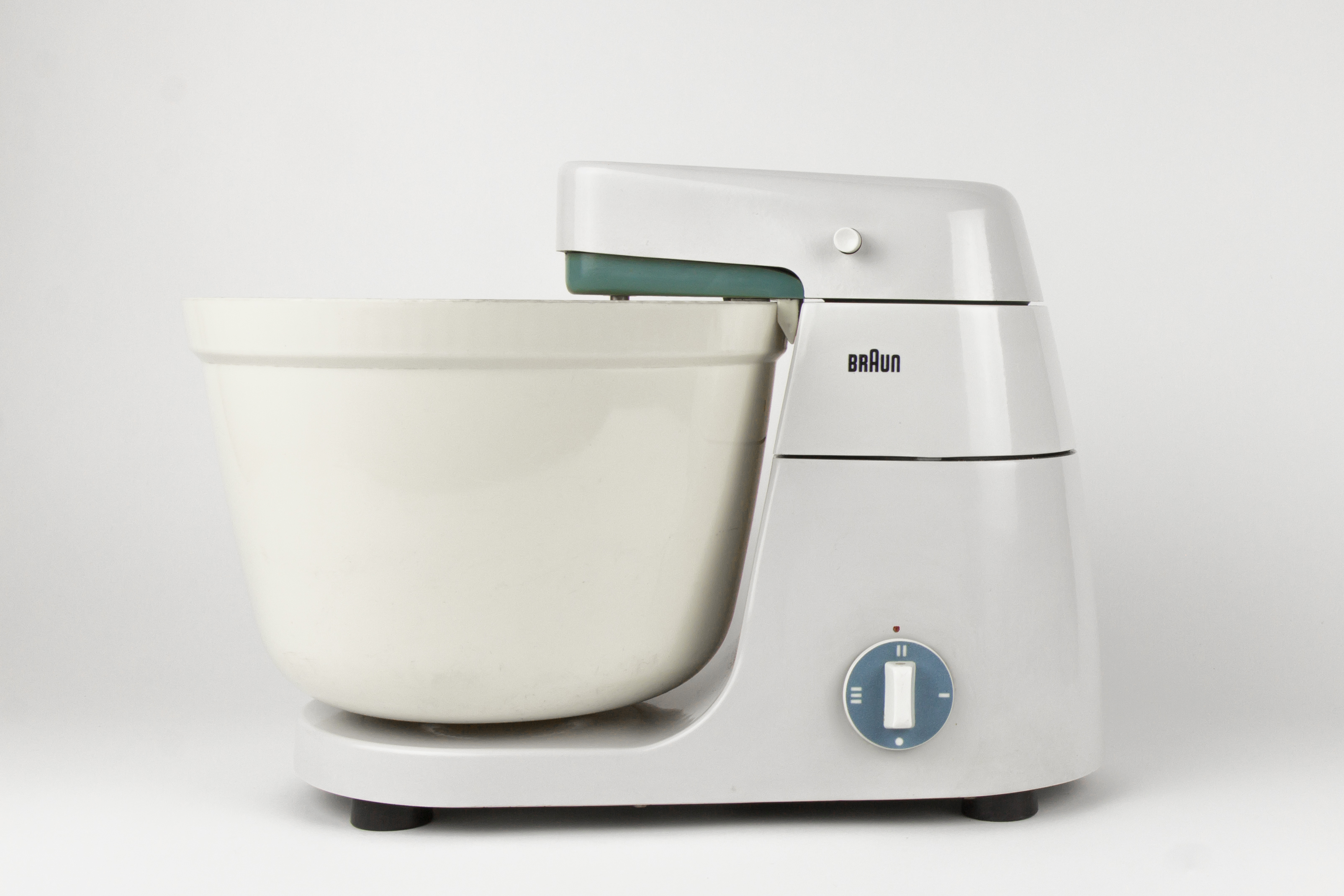
Model KM 3 'Küchenmaschine' food processor (1957)

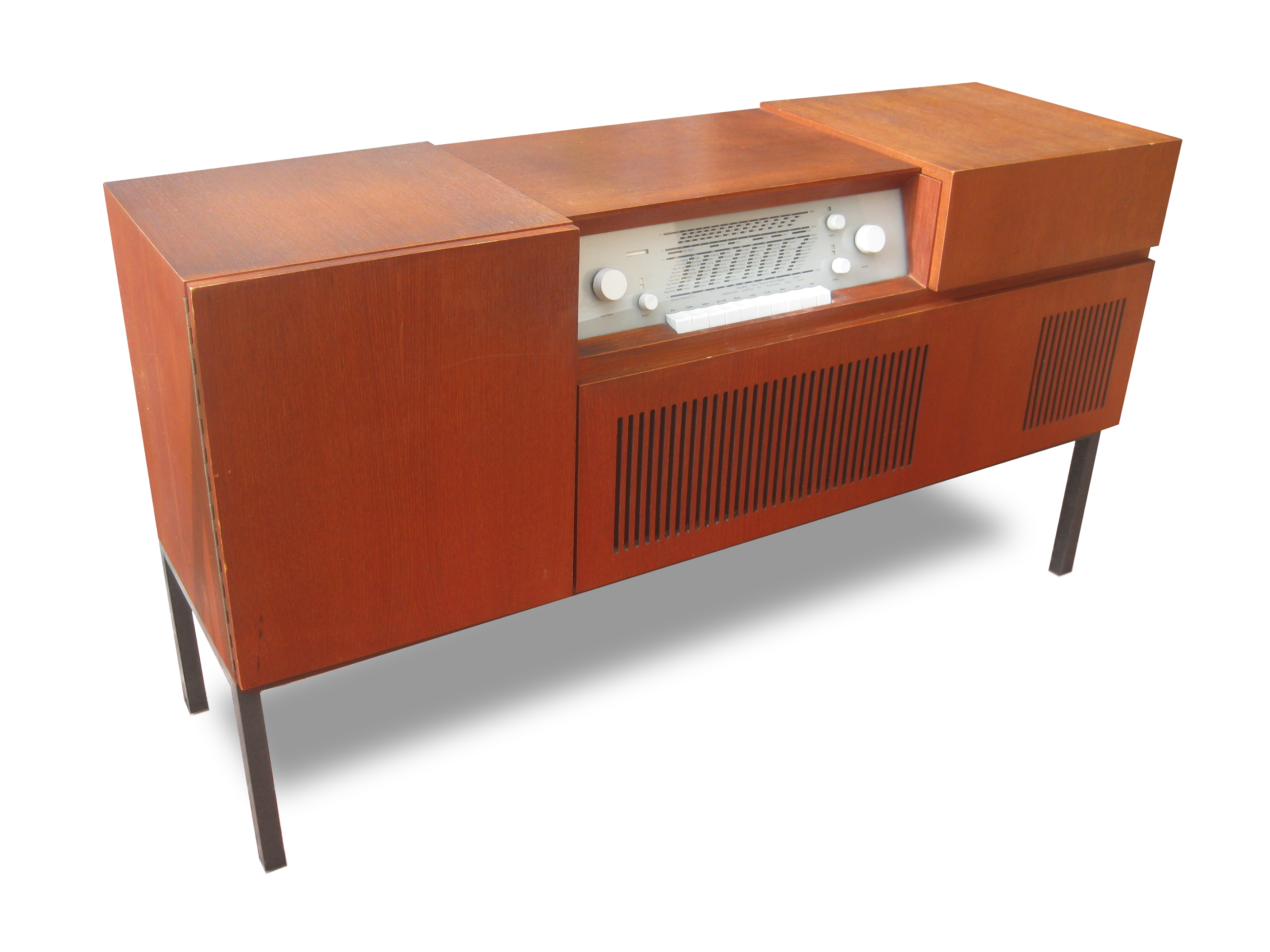
Model HM 6-81 radiogram (1958) (Note: Designed by Herbert Hirche)

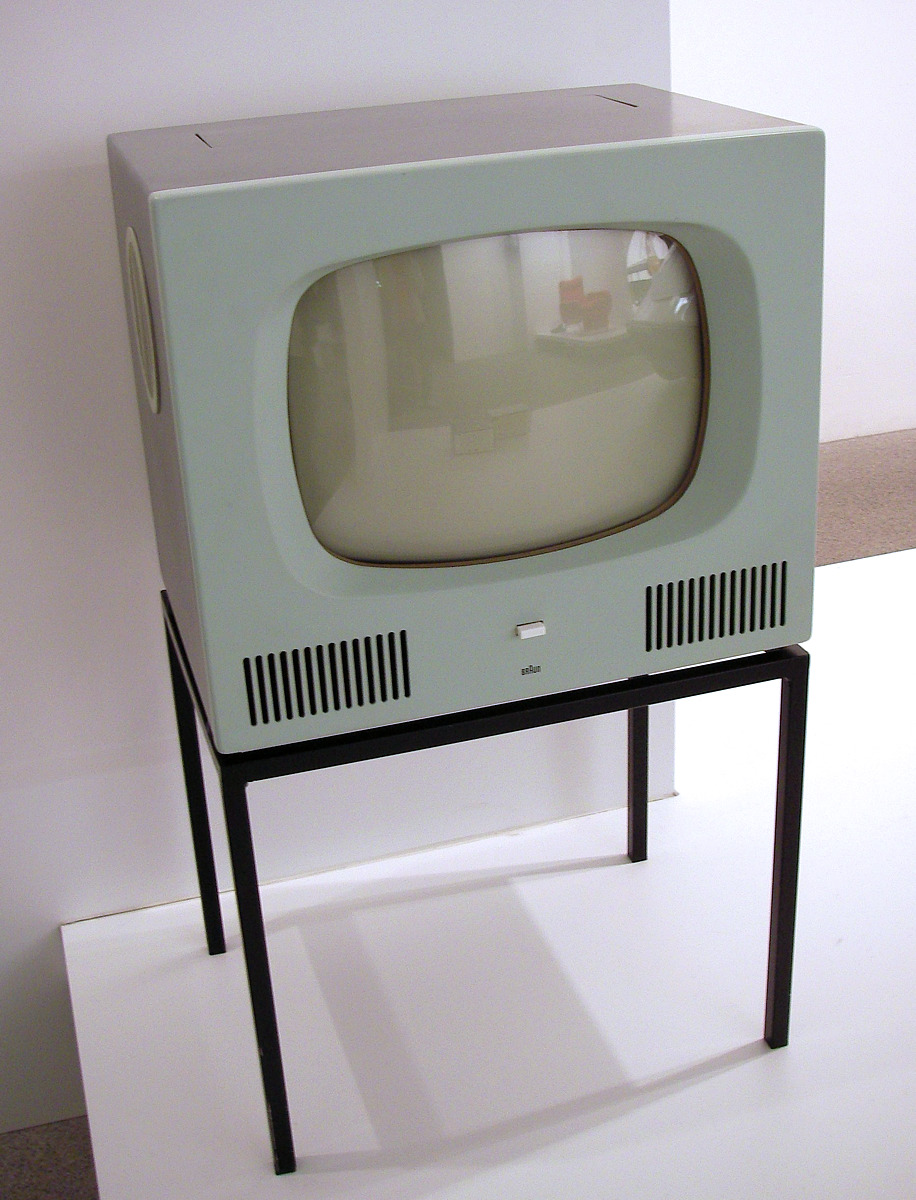
Model HF 1 television (1958)

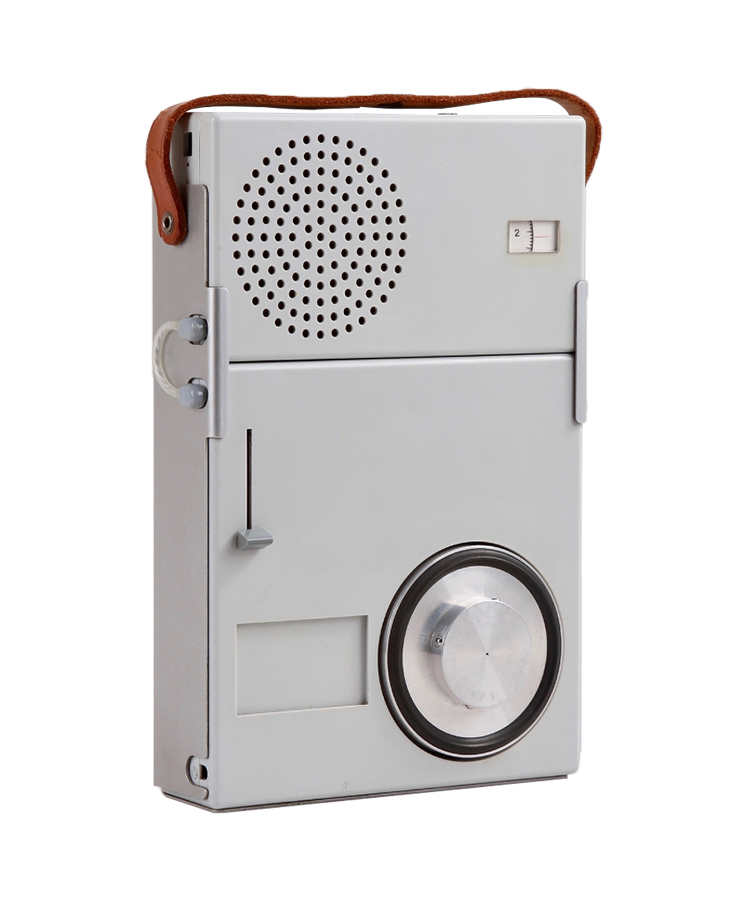
Model TP 1 portable transistor radio and phonograph (1959) (Note: Designed by Dieter Rams)

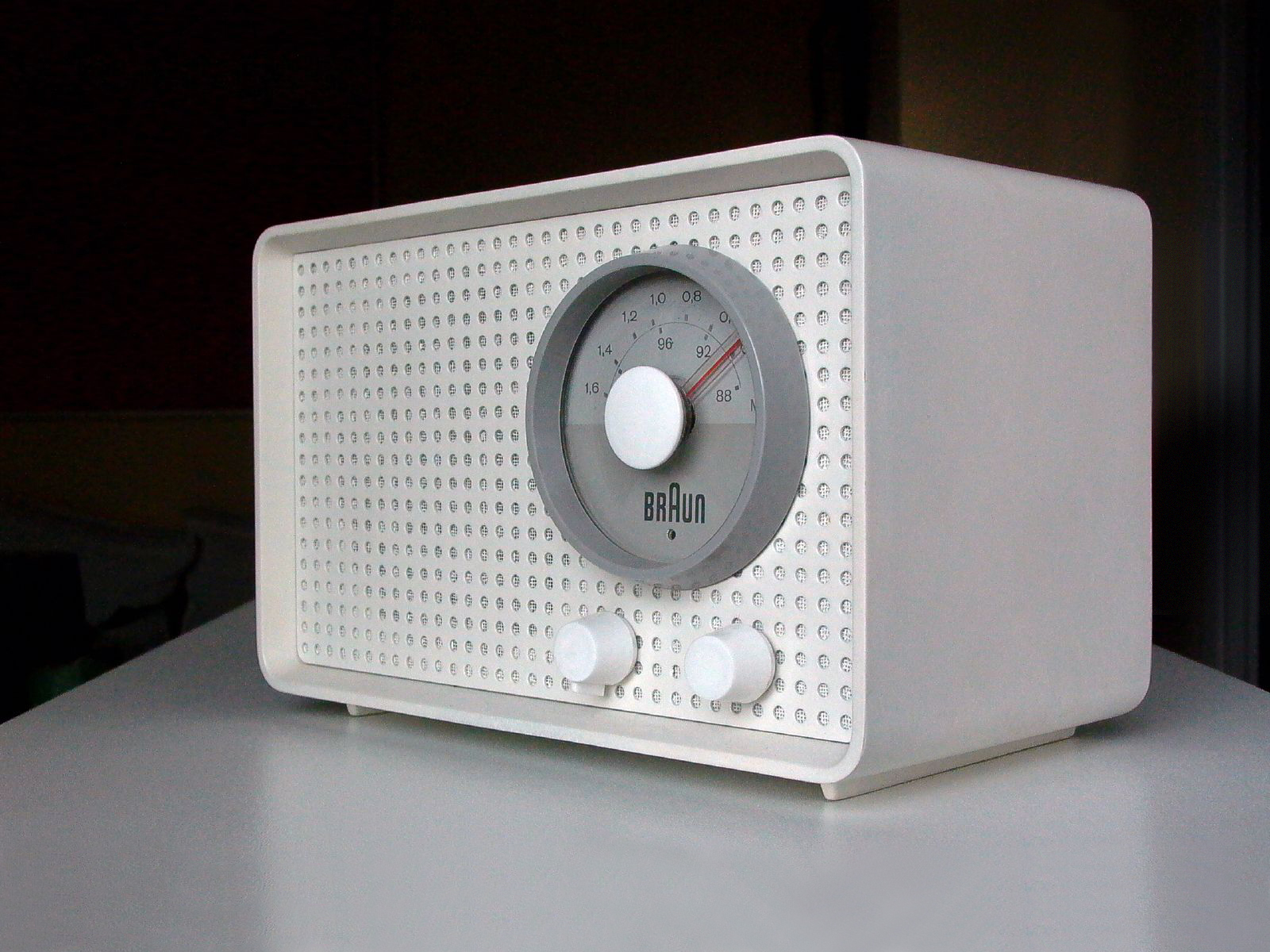
Model SK 2 table radio (1960) (Note: Designed by Fritz Eichler)

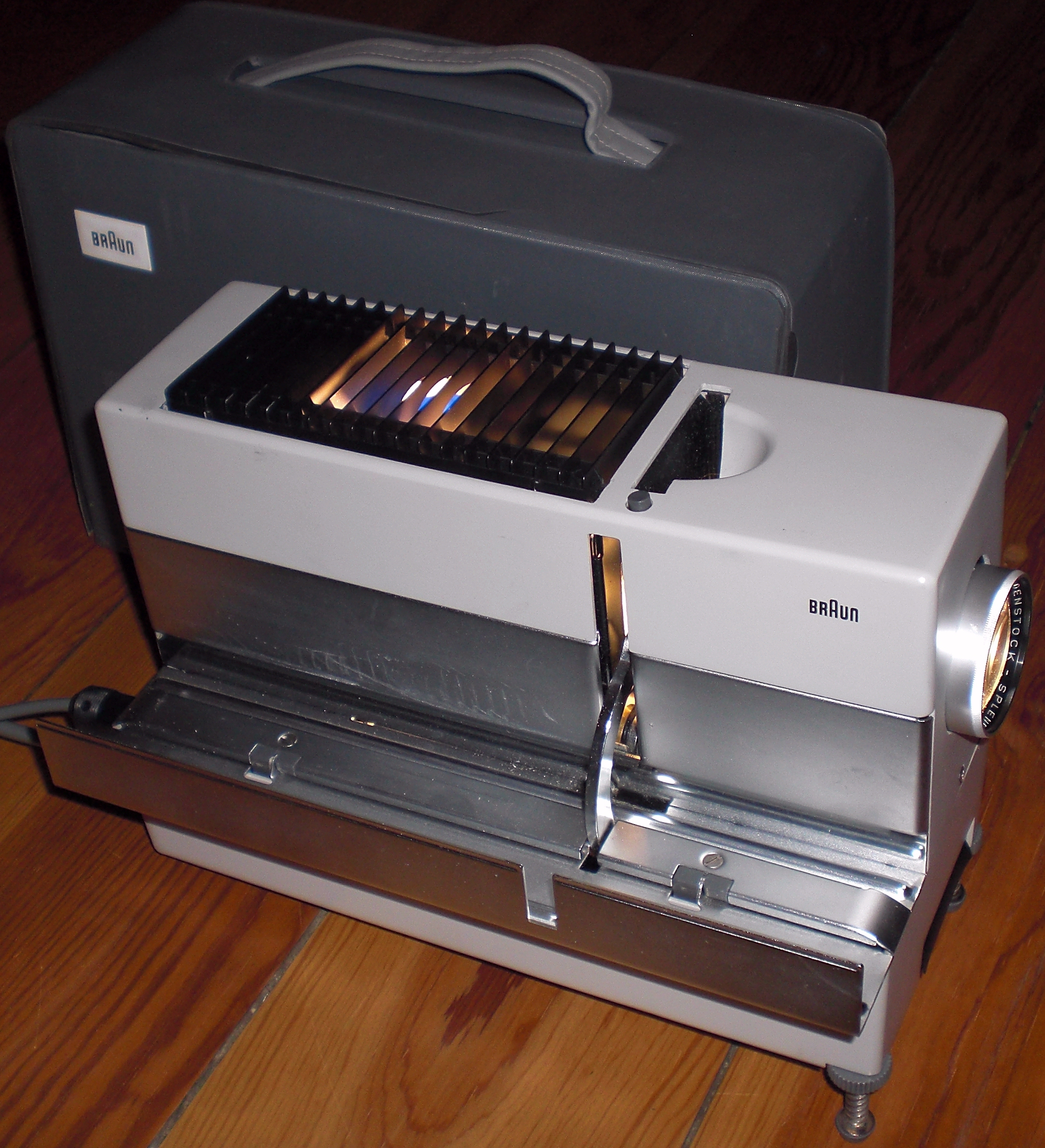
Model D 40 straight tray slide projector (1961)

Tone arm scale (1962)

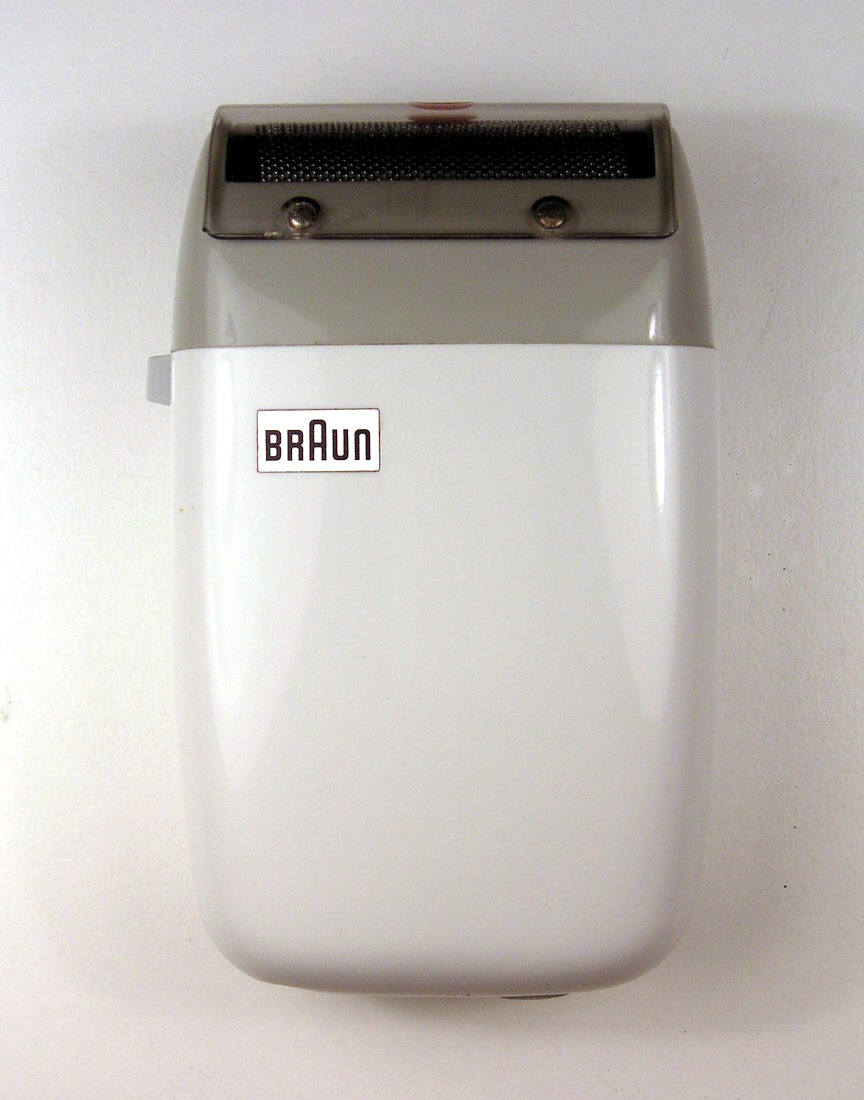
Sixtant SM 2 electric shaver (1963) (Note: Designed by Hans Gugelot and Richard Fischer)

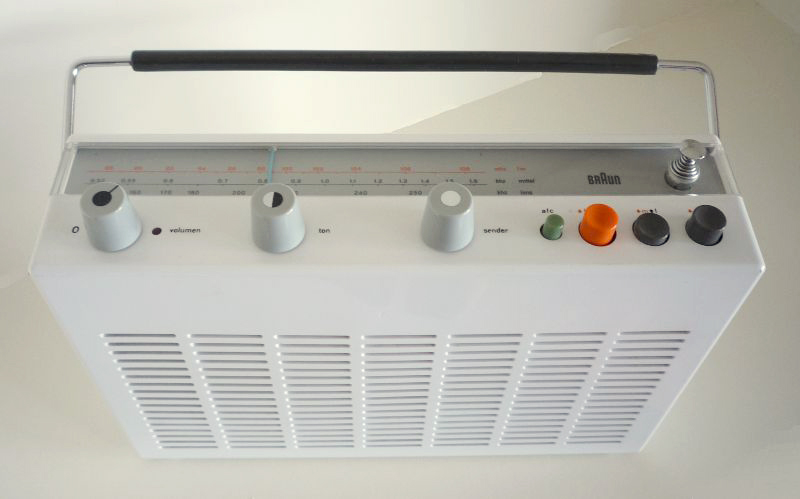
Model T 580 portable radio (1963)

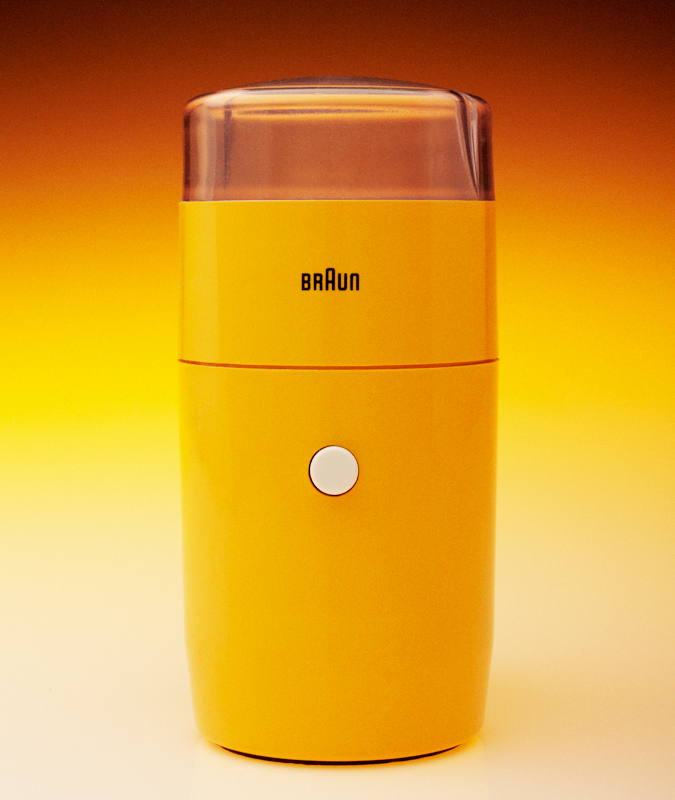
KSM 1/11 coffee grinder (1967) (Note: Designed by Reinhold Weiss)

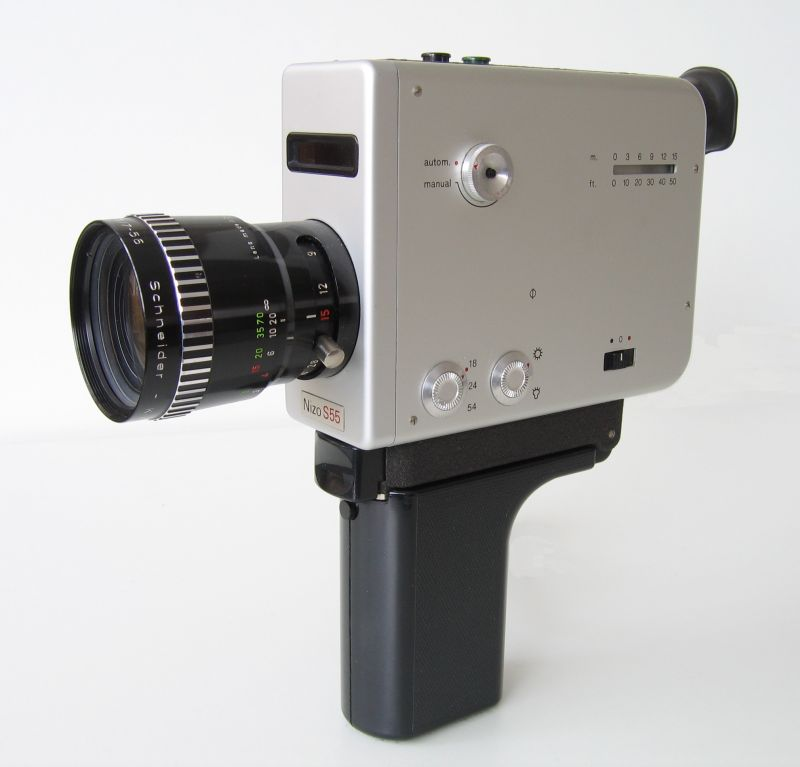
Braun (Nizo) S 55 Super 8 Camera (1968)

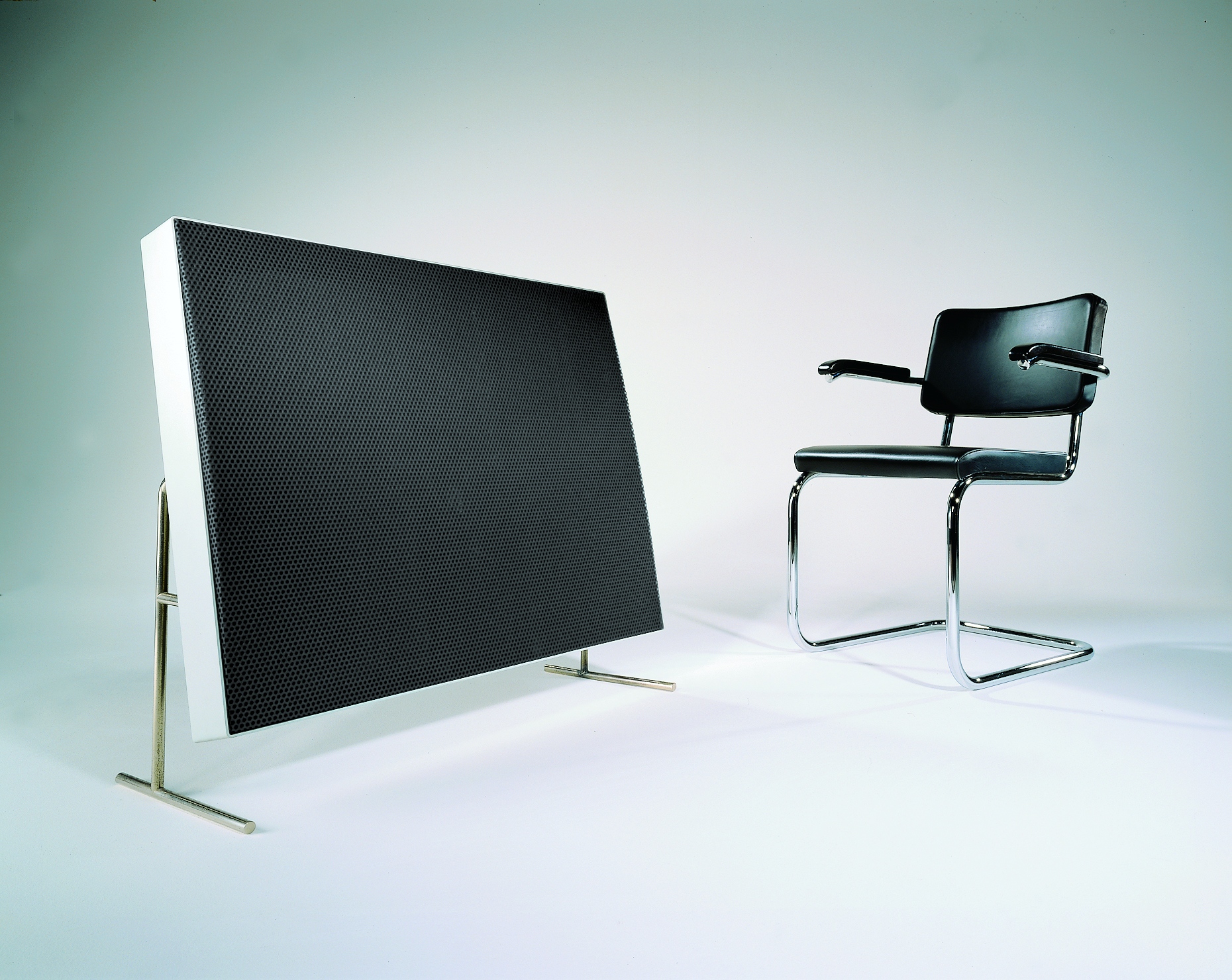
Model LE 1 loudspeaker

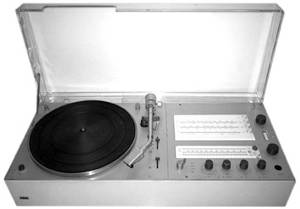
Braun audio 310 stereo (early 1970s)

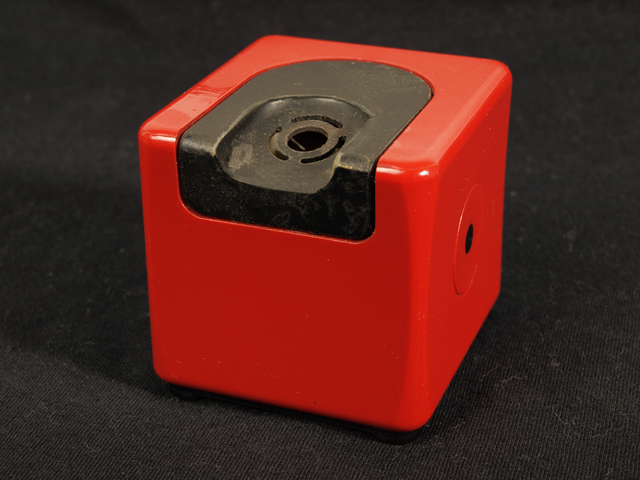
T3 table lighter (1972)

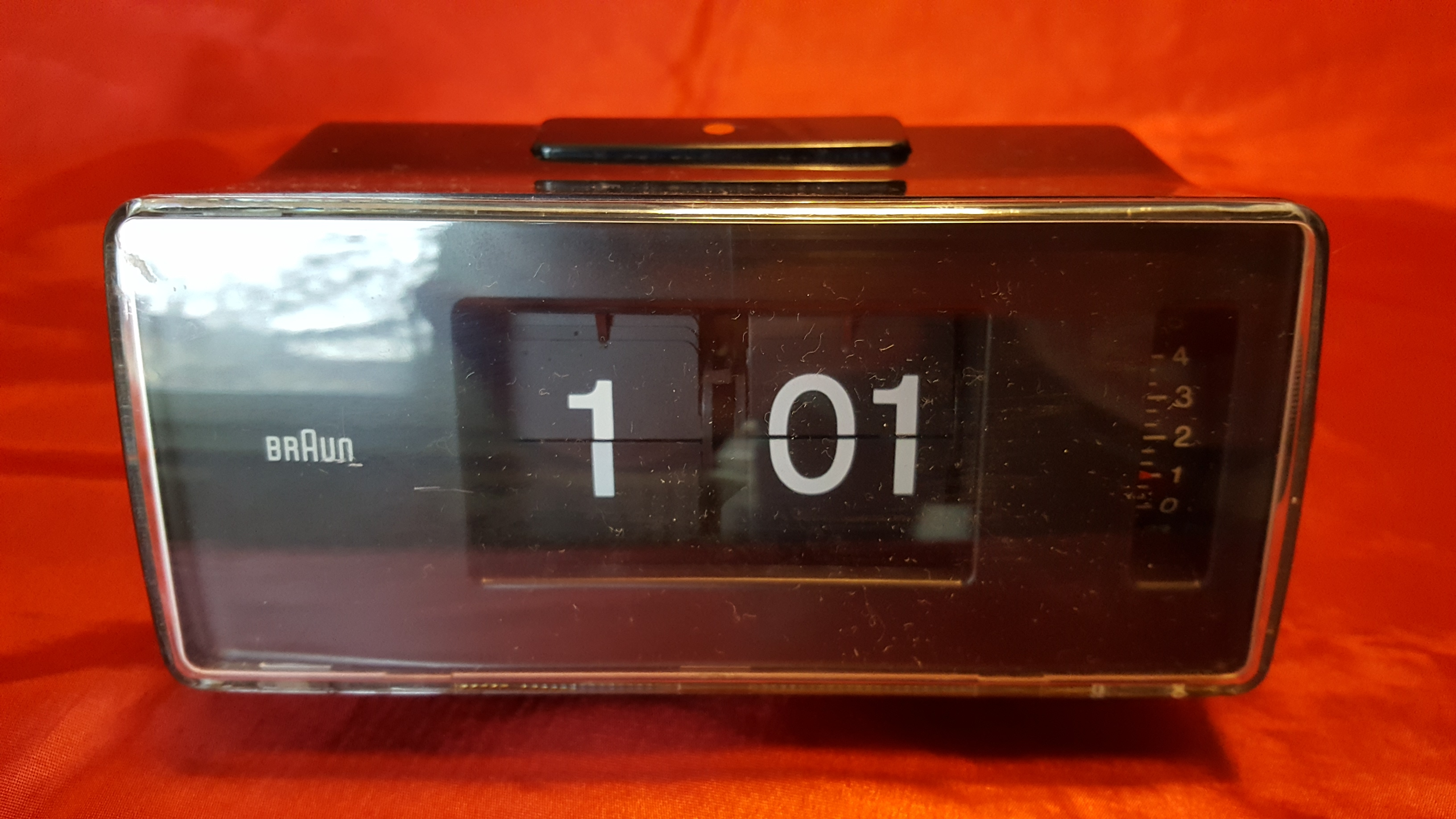
Phase 2 digital flip clock, Model 4934 (1972)

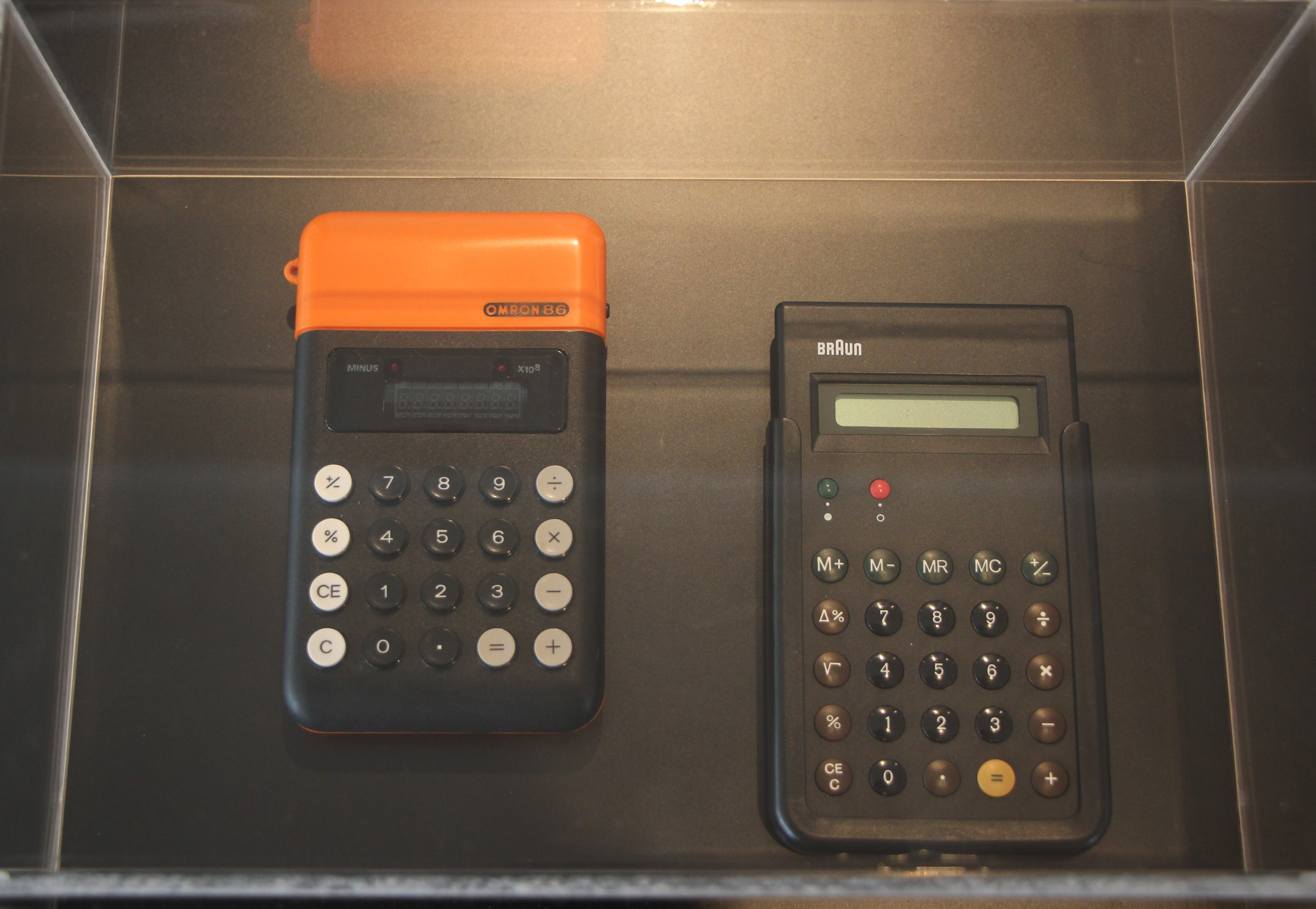
Braun ET44 and Omron 86 calculators (mid-1970s)

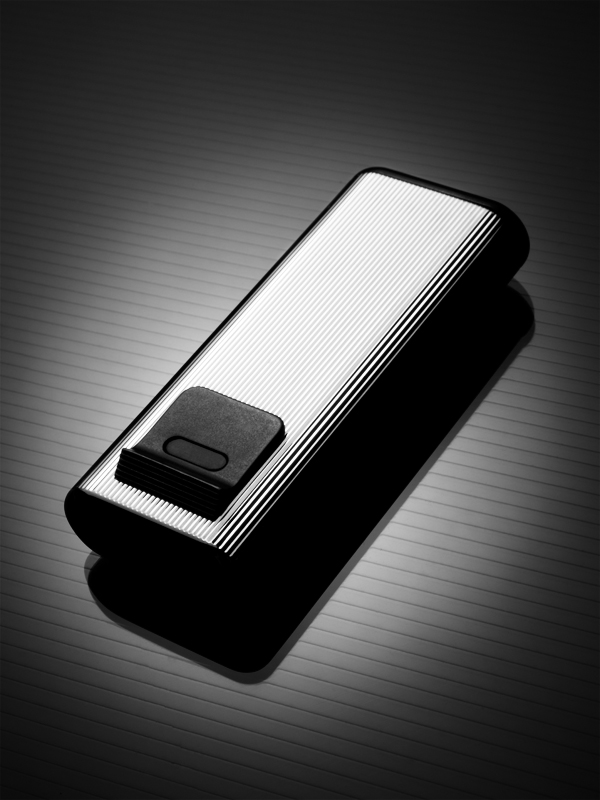
Braun lighter (early 1980s)

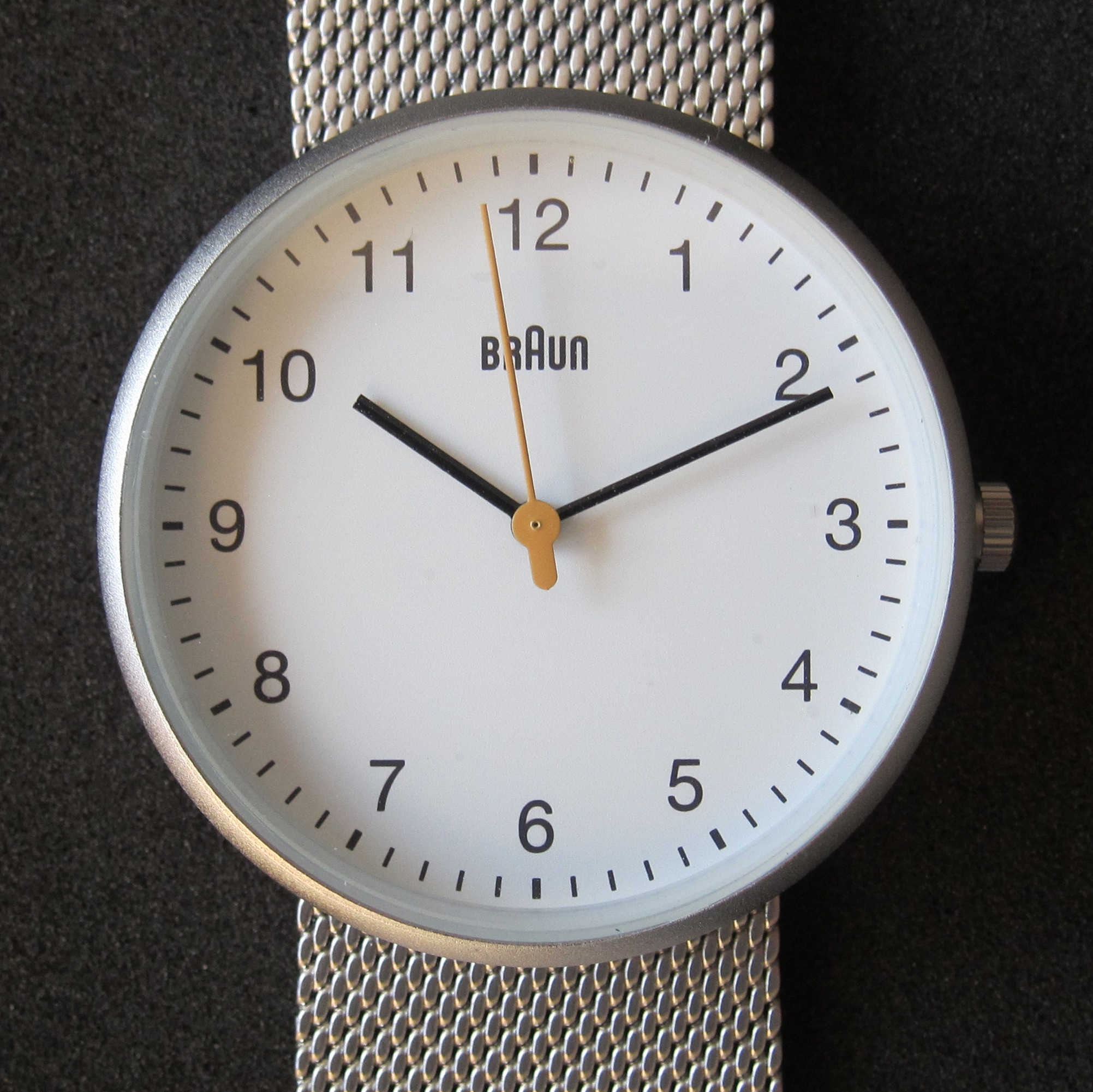
Braun BN0281 wristwatch

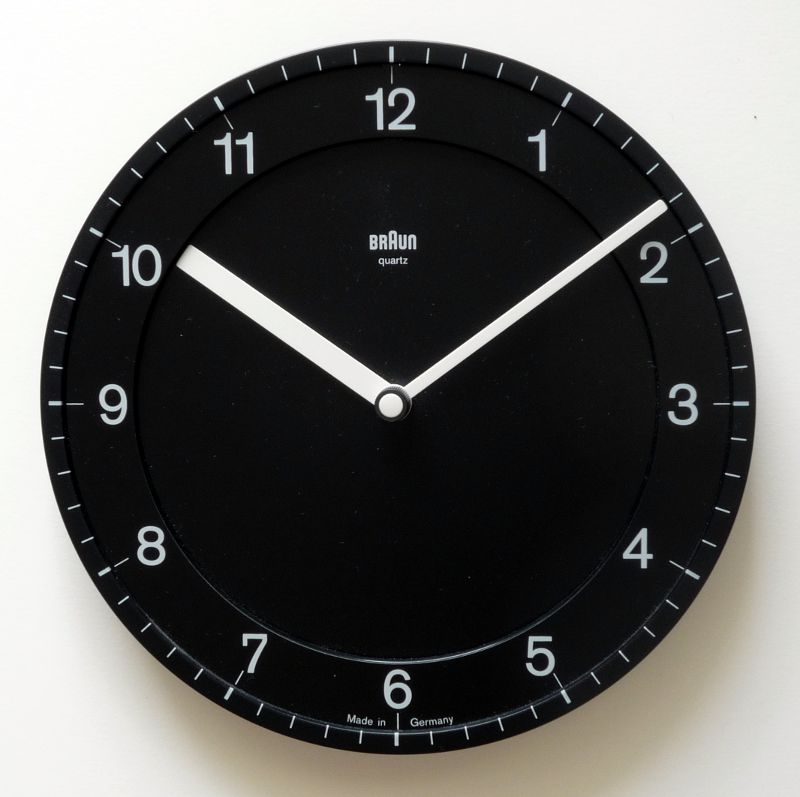
Model ABW 41 wall clock (Note: Designed by Dieter Rams and Dietrich Lubs)

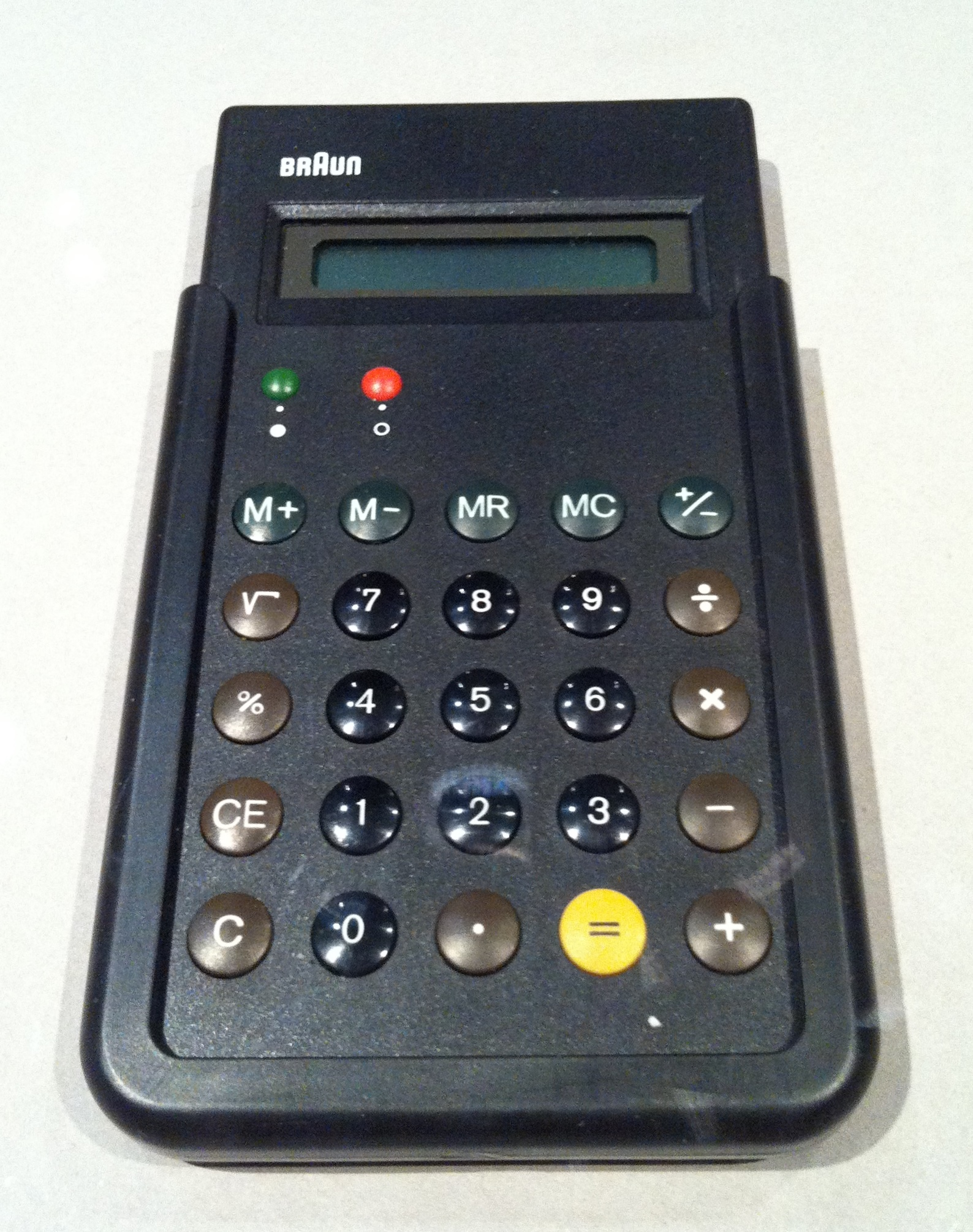
ET66 calculator (1987)

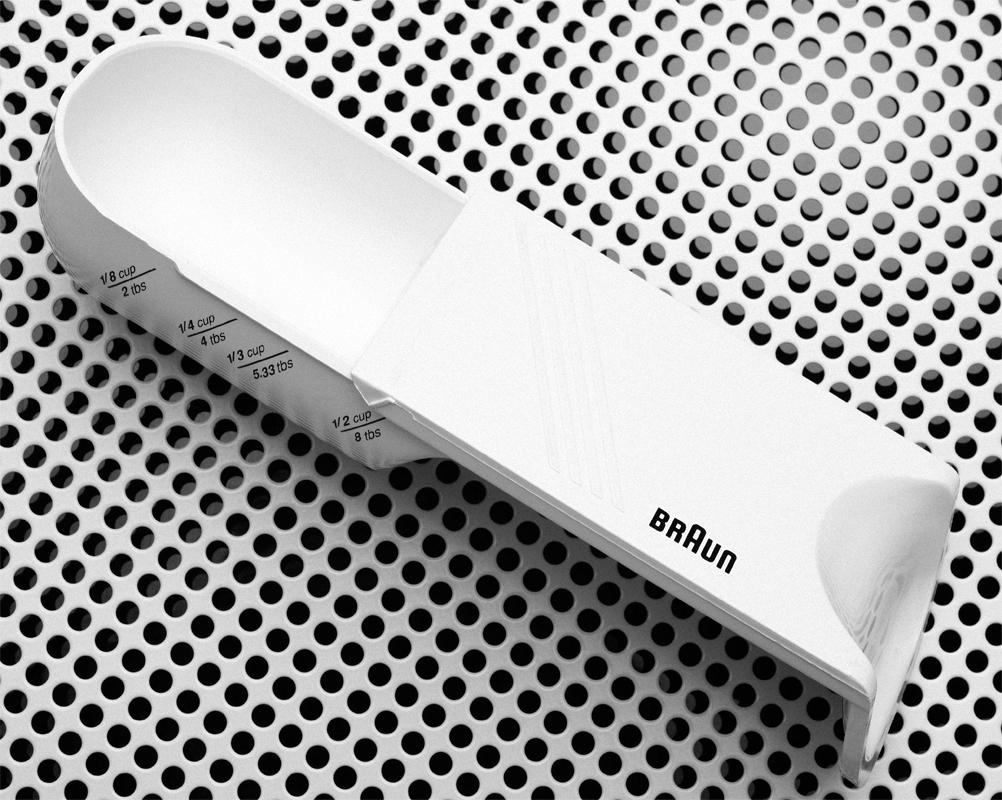
Measuring spoon

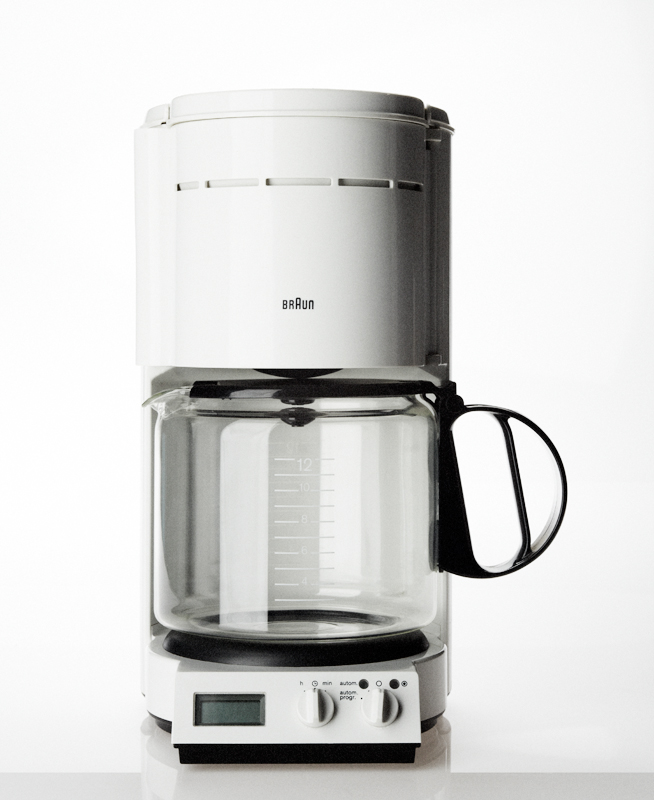
Coffee maker

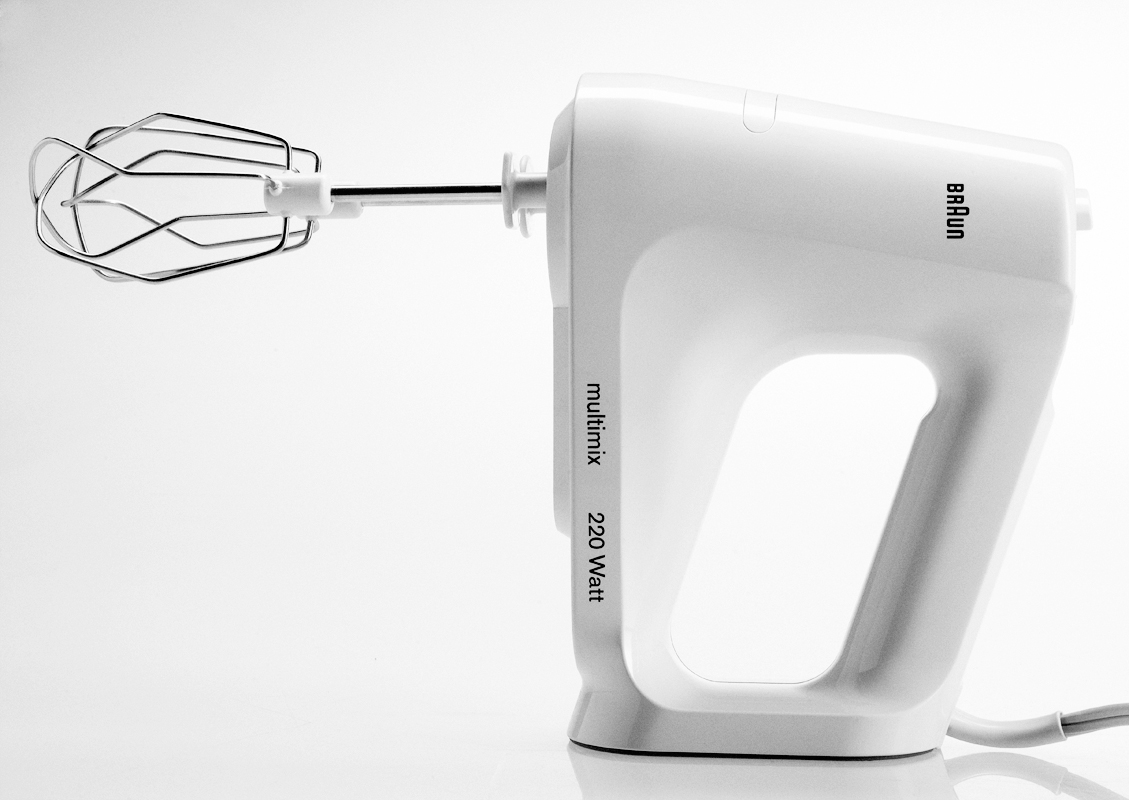
Mixer
