= Reinhold Weiss =

German-born industrial designer (1934–2022)

Reinhold Maria Weiss (10 May 1934 – 6 December 2022) was a German-born industrial designer who lived in Tucson, Arizona. He is known for his contribution to the Functionalist school of industrial design, and the design of products that are now considered icons of the era which led to the success of the Braun brand. Weiss died on 6 December 2022, at the age of 88.

== Biography ==
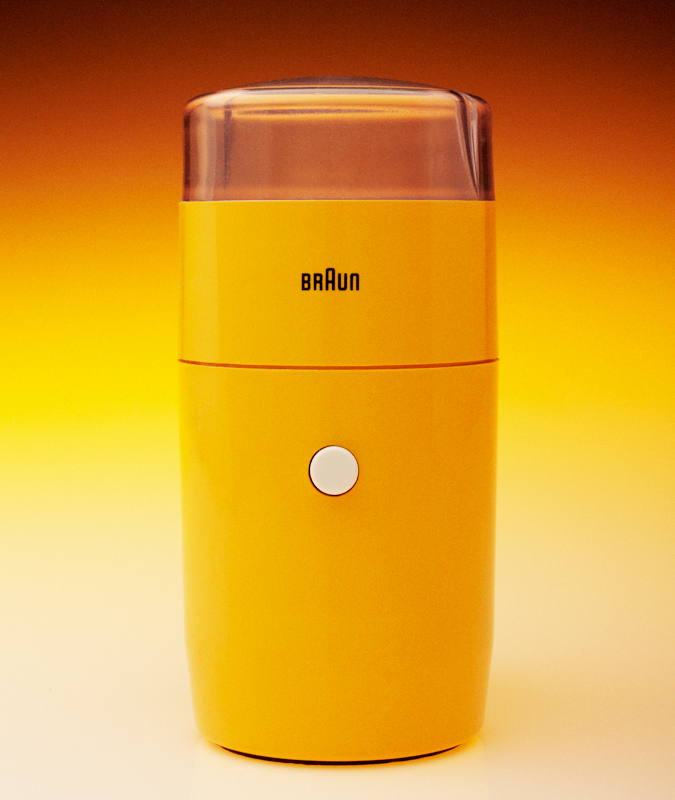
Braun KSM 1/11 coffee grinder (1965)

Weiss's designs for Braun include:

- 1961 HL1 Desk fan
- 1961 HL1/11 Tabletop fan
- 1961 HT1 Toaster
- 1962 HE1 Kettle
- 1964 HLD 2, 23/231 Hair Dryer
- 1965 KMM 1 Coffee Grinder
- 1967 KSM 1 Coffee Grinder
- 1967 H7 Heater
- 1971 HL70 Desk Fan (with Jurgen Greubel)

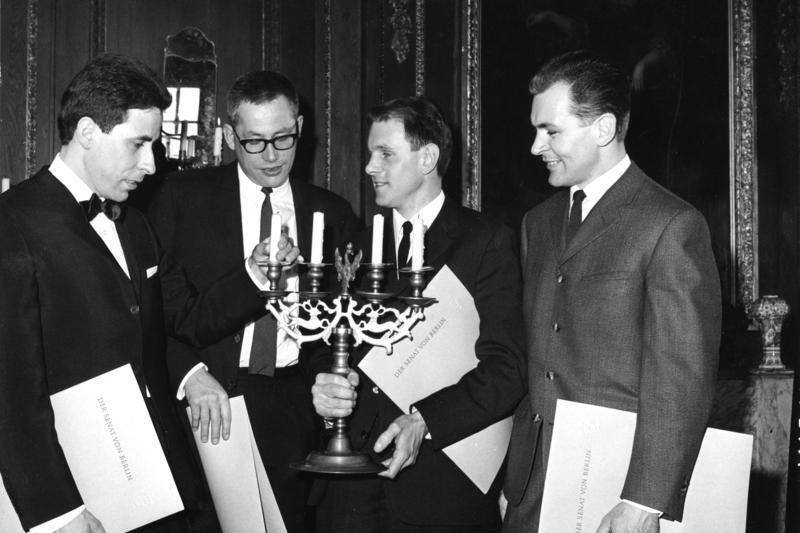
Weiss (left), Dieter Rams, Richard Fischer, and Robert Oberheim at the 1965 Berliner Kunstpreises ceremony

Weiss was awarded the 1965 Berliner Kunstpreis Bildende Kunst, Junge Generation' (alongside Dieter Rams, Richard Fischer, and Robert Oberheim).

Examples of Weiss's designs are in the collections of the Museum of Modern Art, Indianapolis Museum of Art, Musée d'art moderne et contemporain in France, and the Israel Museum.
