= Braun LE1 =

German hi-fi loudspeaker

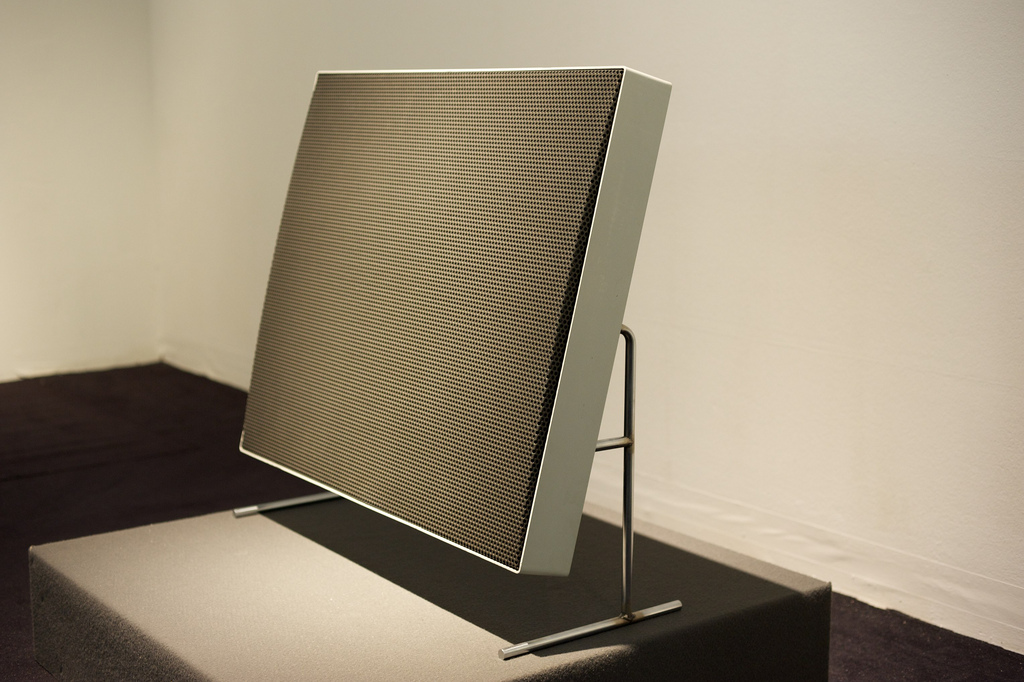
- Type: Electrostatic loudspeaker
- Inception: 1960
- Manufacturer: Braun

The Braun LE1, Loudspeaker Unit 1 (German: Lautsprechereinheit 1), was the first electrostatic loudspeaker available on the German hi-fi market. German electronics company Braun started production in 1960 with the technology licensed from the British Acoustical Manufacturing Co. Ltd. (now known as QUAD Electroacoustics).

The electronics inside were very similar to QUAD's famous ESL-57, however there were differences. While the stators were identical, the transformers and high voltage cascade were specially developed by Braun.

The loudspeakers were fed the audio signal plus a 220 Volt power supply by a special 4-wire cable using any of the following Braun tube amplifiers:

- CV11 (power amplifier of modular STUDIO 2 Hifi unit)
- CSV13 and CSV60 (integrated amplifiers).

The speaker casing and supporting struts were designed by famed German designer Dieter Rams. The LE1 is held in the collection of the Museum of Modern Art.
