= José Álvarez-Bril =

José Álvarez-Brill
- Also known as: JAB
- Born: José Álvarez-Brill; 3 February 1963; Kassel, West Germany
- Died: 16 October 2020 (aged 57) Berlin, Germany
- Occupations: Record producer; composer; musician; songwriter; remixer
- Years active: 1990–2020

José Álvarez-Brill (3 February 1963 – 16 October 2020) was a German record producer, composer and musician. He worked with artists including Peter Heppner, Joachim Witt, Wolfsheim, De/Vision and X-Perience. He also founded and operated Pleasurepark Studios in Berlin and was involved in several electronic music projects.

Álvarez-Brill was the producer of the 1998 single "Die Flut" by Joachim Witt and Peter Heppner. The single reached number two on the German charts, remained in the chart for 37 weeks and was certified platinum after selling more than 900,000 copies.

== Life and career ==
José Álvarez-Brill was born in Kassel on 3 February 1963.

He studied economics, business administration and marketing at the FH Aachen from 1982 and completed his studies in 1990. He subsequently became involved in electronic music projects, working in styles including Eurodance and darkwave. Together with Gento Navaho and Carlos Perón, he formed the project 909, also known as Nine-O-Nine, which released the single "The Hexer".

In 1992, Álvarez-Brill was involved in the production of Wolfsheim's debut album No Happy View. In the same year he founded Pleasurepark Studios in Berlin. The studio subsequently became associated with artists including Schiller, Camouflage and Depeche Mode.

In 1993, Álvarez-Brill and Rogelio Sanchez Torres formed the Eurodance duo Think! Big. The duo released the singles "Wouldn't It Be Good" and "Without You". In 1994, Álvarez-Brill was also involved in the Eurodance project Exit. Think! Big later changed its name to Matanza and released the single "Matador".

In 1998, Álvarez-Brill produced "Die Flut", performed by Joachim Witt and Peter Heppner. The song became his most commercially successful production.

In 1999, Álvarez-Brill co-founded the band Unheilig with Grant Stevens and Der Graf. He remained involved with the project until 2002.

In 2001, Álvarez-Brill formed the synth-pop trio Care Company with Markus Reinhardt, formerly of Wolfsheim, and Carsten Klatte of Project Pitchfork. The group released the album In the Flow in the same year. The album was released by Motor Music, with Álvarez-Brill and Reinhardt credited in the production of the project.

In 2003, Álvarez-Brill co-wrote and produced the theme music for the German television programme Stern TV.

In 2004, he was nominated for an ECHO award in the category of Producer of the Year for his work with Wolfsheim.

In 2005, Álvarez-Brill released the remix album Alvarez Presents Zeitmaschine Remixed. The album included "Vielleicht?", a collaboration with Peter Heppner released under the name Alvarez & Heppner.

Álvarez-Brill also worked as a remixer and producer for artists including Rosenstolz, Kosheen, Northern Lite and X-Perience. In 2006 he produced three remixes of songs by X-Perience for the band's album Lost in Paradise.

In 2009, Álvarez-Brill founded Hard Six Entertainment GmbH and became a shareholder in Orange Glow Production Inc. in Florida. In 2017, he co-founded the Berlin-based music label Fasterone Music with the artist management agency Roko Concerts. The company combined the Fasterone label with Pleasurepark Studios and the publishing company The Factory.

His later musical project was Neufeld, a tribute act dedicated to the repertoire of Wolfsheim. The project was formed with Sven Kordaß and Frank Körner-Steding.

== Death ==
José Álvarez-Brill died in Berlin on 16 October 2020, aged 57.

== Discography ==
=== Remix albums ===
- Alvarez Presents Zeitmaschine Remixed (2005)

=== Singles ===
- "Vielleicht?" (with Peter Heppner, as Alvarez & Heppner) (2005)
- "Dieser Augenblick" (with Peter Heppner) (2010)
