= The Sparrows and the Nightingales =

1991 single by Wolfsheim

- CD version cover

Single by Wolfsheim

from the album No Happy View
- B-side: "It's All the Rage"
- Released: 15 July 1991
- Genre: Synthpop
- Length: 10:23
- Label: Strange Ways
- Songwriters: Peter Heppner, Martin Müller, Markus Reinhardt
- Producer: Carlos Peron

Wolfsheim singles chronology
"The Sparrows and the Nightingales" (1991)	"It's Not Too Late (Don't Sorrow)" (1992)

"The Sparrows and the Nightingales" is the debut single by Wolfsheim. Written by Peter Heppner and Markus Reinhardt, it was featured on their album No Happy View.

Although the original release did not chart, the song has been covered by several artists, with the 1999 version by Mark 'Oh versus John Davies charting on the German Media Control charts for 14 weeks, peaking at number 14.

== Original release ==
The original Wolfsheim release of the song did not chart, but was a club hit and was widely available on various compilations.

Reinhardt says the lyric was inspired by The Great Gatsby by F. Scott Fitzgerald, "wegen der 'lautmalerischen Spannung' zwischen Raubtier und Geborgenheit gereizt" ("in the 'onomatopoeic tension' between predator and security").

=== Track listing ===
12" single

1. "The Sparrows and the Nightingales" - 6:45
2. "Leading Man" - 2:58

CD single

1. "The Sparrows and the Nightingales" - 6:45
2. "Leading Man" - 2:58
3. "The Sparrows and the Nightingales" (radio edit) - 3:11

== Mark 'Oh versus John Davies version ==
"The Sparrows and the Nightingales"

Single by Mark 'Oh

from the album Rebirth
- Released: May 10, 1999
- Recorded: Studi'Oh for Randy Recordings
- Length: 27:42
- Songwriters: Peter Heppner, Martin Müller, Markus Reinhardt
- Producers: Claus Hägele; Marko Albrecht

Mark 'Oh singles chronology
"The Team on Tour" (1998)	"The Sparrows and the Nightingales" (1999)	"Your Love" (1999)

In 1999, Mark 'Oh versus John Davies covered the song for the album Rebirth. The single peaked at number 14 on the Media Control Charts, staying on the chart for 14 weeks.

=== Track listing ===
1. "The Sparrows and the Nightingales" (short mix) (3:15)
2. "The Sparrows and the Nightingales" (long mix) (5:11)
3. "The Sparrows and the Nightingales" (Oliver Lieb main mix) (6:27)
4. "The Sparrows and the Nightingales" (D.V. remix) (6:02)
5. "The Sparrows and the Nightingales" (Oliver Lieb club mix) (6:27)

== Other versions ==
German gothic metal band Scream Silence covered the song in 2000.

Electronic band the Echoing Green covered the song on the 2004 edition of their album The Winter of Our Discontent.
