= Urlaub =

Urlaub may refer to:

== People ==
- Farin Urlaub (born 1963), German singer
- Georg Anton Urlaub (1713–1759), Baroque painter

== Other uses ==
- Urlaub auf Ehrenwort (1938 film), film
- Urlaub auf Ehrenwort (1955 film), film
- Endlich Urlaub!, album
- Urlaub in Polen, band
