= Slide cube projector =

The Slide Cube Projector is a slide projector and system, manufactured and marketed by Bell & Howell, which was introduced in 1970 and marketed through the 1980s. The projector derived its name from its transparent cubical plastic slide storage magazine, approximately 5.5 cm (2.2 in) in each dimension (a bit larger than a standard 135 film slide mount), that held 36 to 44 slides, depending on the mount thickness. The magazine used a sliding lid to hold the slides in place. Unlike competing systems which used straight tray or carousel magazines, the slides in a Slide Cube are stacked on top of each other rather than stored in separate slots.

The system consisted of Slide Cubes and a projector designed to use them. Bell & Howell subsequently introduced a Slide Cube Projector II, with revised features, before discontinuing the system in the 1980s. Although Slide Cube Projectors are no longer manufactured, as of 2024 cubes, bulbs, a few replacement parts, and complete used projectors are available on the second-hand market.

== Design and operation ==
When a cube is placed on the slide projector in the PRE-LOAD position, then slid into the LOAD position, its lid opens. As the advance trigger is activated, a sequence is initiated which starts by dropping a single slide into the slide advance mechanism, which uses a circular turntable with slide-size holes. The turntable has four distinct positions; in sequence, these are:

1. LOAD
2. PREVIEW
3. PROJECTION
4. RETURN

The turntable is thinner than a single slide, which allows just one slide at a time to drop from the cube into the LOAD position. The PREVIEW position allows the operator to check if the slide is loaded correctly before advancing into the PROJECTION position, where the image is projected onto the screen for viewing by the audience. The next position, RETURN, is available so the turntable can be reversed, allowing a slide in RETURN position to move back to PROJECTION, which gives the projector the capability to manually reverse the show by a single slide. After the RETURN position, the turntable finally rotates to the (RE)LOAD position, where the slide drops out of the turntable into a stack and another slide is taken from the cube. After the slides have been viewed, the operator presses a lever which lifts the slides back into the cube.

Most of the projectors use a 300 watt 120 V multifaceted reflector halogen lamp (ANSI code ELH) as a light source; early models use a 500 W lamp without reflector (code CBA) instead. In addition to the on-projector controls, it could optionally be operated by a wired remote control, or the "Time Cube" automatic advancement accessory. The projector had an integrated handle, plastic lid or optional lid which incorporated additional cube storage. A sliding front foot or tilting lens adjustment were used to change the elevation of the projected image. Several alternative projection lenses were offered.

Bell & Howell Slide Cubes were less expensive than trays and provided denser and cheaper storage capacity, with a book or drawer of 16 forty-slide cubes (640 slides) occupying the same space as a single round tray holding at most 140 slides. Stack storage and preview facilitated editing of slideshows; slides could be added to or removed from the show without having to move all of the remaining slides to fill the gap. Some tray-based projectors (e.g. some Kodak round-tray and Hähnel straight-tray slide projectors) also could use stack loaders to view a stack of slides, but did not allow addition or removal of slides, and did not have an associated storage system.

Drawbacks of the slide cube included the inability to go back by more than one slide, the fragility of the cubes, and the advancing turntable's tendency to jam if a slide mount was not perfect, interrupting slide shows and making the projectors challenging to operate.

=== Models ===
Bell & Howell Slide Cube Projector models
Feature Model (Note: Model numbers are as written on the nameplate, or stamped on the bottom of the projector. The models which take CBA lamps also have the model number stamped in the metal lamp shield door.)	Series	Lens			Focus	Lamp
Feature Model	Series	Focal length	Aperture	Tilt	Focus	Lamp
965Q	Slide Cube (Note: Original Slide Cube projectors, c. 1970–1973, feature a silver ring around the projection lens mounting barrel and are finished in black plastic or woodgrain vinyl panels; lids are opaque woodgrain vinyl.)			Yes	Automatic	CBA
975Q	Slide Cube			Yes		CBA
977Q	Slide Cube			Yes		CBA
978Q	Slide Cube			Yes		CBA
981Q	Slide Cube			Yes	Automatic	CBA
982Q	Slide Cube			Yes		CBA
991 (early)	Slide Cube			Yes	Automatic	CBA
452	Slide Cube (transitional) (Note: Slide Cube transitional projectors, c. 1974–1976, feature the projector model name on the front, a broad, colored ring around the projection lens mounting barrel, depending on if the lens tilts (chrome) or not (black), and are finished in woodgrain vinyl panels; lids are opaque woodgrain vinyl or black acrylic.)			Yes		ELH
986	Slide Cube (transitional)	100 mm	f/2.8	Yes		ELH
987	Slide Cube (transitional)			Yes		ELH
991 (late)	Slide Cube (transitional)			Yes	Automatic	ELH
992	Slide Cube (transitional)			Yes	Automatic	ELH
RC55 (857BH)	Slide Cube (transitional), Slide Cube II (Note: Slide Cube II projectors, c. 1977–1982, feature a black ring with a colored stripe around the projection lens mounting barrel matching the color of the model on the front nameplate and are finished in woodgrain vinyl panels; lids are translucent black acrylic.)	100 mm	f/3.5	No	Manual	ELH
RF60 (859B)	Slide Cube (transitional), Slide Cube II	100 mm	f/3.5	No	Remote	ELH
AF70 (861BH)	Slide Cube (transitional), Slide Cube II	100 mm	f/3.5	No	Automatic	ELH
AF70Z (861Z, 861BHZ)	Slide Cube (transitional), Slide Cube II	85–115 mm	f/3.5	No	Automatic	ELH
AF80 (863BZ)	Slide Cube (transitional), Slide Cube II	85–115 mm	f/3.5	No	Automatic	ELH
CP40	Slide Cube II	100 mm	f/3.5	No	Manual	ELH
RC50	Slide Cube II	100 mm	f/3.5	No	Manual	ELH
RF50	Slide Cube II	100 mm	f/3.5	No	Remote	ELH
AF66	Slide Cube II			No	Automatic	ELH
AF72 (861H)	Slide Cube II	100 mm	f/3.5	No	Automatic	ELH

A version of the AF70 was sold by Sears as the Opticube (model 802).

=== Lenses ===
All Slide Cube projectors are compatible with any of the four available lenses. Lens appearance depends on age, with the earliest lenses featuring silver-colored finishes on the focusing (and zoom) ring, coordinating with the earliest Slide Cube projectors; lenses originally sold with the Slide Cube System II may be marked as Lumina II.

- Lumina 64 mm (2 1/2") f/3.5 for 110 film slides
- Filmovara Lumina 85–115 mm (3 1/2–4 1/2") f/3.5
- Lumina 100 mm (4") f/2.8
- Lumina 100 mm (4") f/3.5

== See also ==
- Franke & Heidecke Rolleiscop
