= Urlaub in Polen =

German musical duo

- Origin: Cologne, North Rhine-Westphalia. Germany
- Genres: Indie rock, electronic, electronic rock, hard rock, noise rock, math rock, experimental rock, neo-psychedelia, space rock, krautrock, dance-punk, post-punk
- Years active: 1999–present
- Labels: RAKETEmusik, Strange Ways, Blunoise, Rough Trade, Tomlab, Hausmusik, Tapete, Indigo
- Members: Georg Brenner; Jan Philipp Janzen
- Past members: Oli

Urlaub in Polen (German for "Holiday in Poland") is a German noise rock electronica duo formed in 1999 in Cologne.

== Biography ==
Urlaub in Polen was originally formed by Georg Brenner and Oli, but shortly after Oli quit the project in 2000, Georg Brenner joined forces with Jan Philipp Janzen comprising the current line-up.

After having released their first recording, the eponymously titled EP, through the German recording studio Institut für Wohlklangforschung in 1999, Urlaub in Polen signed to German noise rock label RAKETEmusik through which they have so far released three studio albums, as well as an EP.

Although they are only two man on stage, Urlaub in Polen have built themselves a reputation as a highly energetic live band. Thus they were recognised by Northern Europe's biggest music festival, Roskilde Festival, who put them on the bill in 2003. Live they are sometimes supported with Super 8 slide projections by Mark Witzel.

== Band members ==
=== Current members ===
- Georg Brenner (1999–present) – vocals, Moog, guitars, synthesizers.
- Jan Philipp Janzen (2000–present) – drums, samples, percussion, Moog.

=== Past members ===
- Oli (1999–2000).

== Musical style ==
Among Urlaub in Polen's influences have been cited Trans Am and Neu!, but also the influence of as varied bands as Joy Division, Dead Can Dance, The Prodigy and Kraftwerk might be suggested in their music, which merges (post)punk-inspired noise rock, drum'n'bass-rhythms and synthesizer-driven, somewhat ambient and dreamy soundscapes into something new and unique. Roskilde Festival put it this way: "... The music is energetic and relaxing at the same time ... Urlaub in Polen, is highly acclaimed in Germany for their album Parsec, released [in 2002]. They are renowned for having made the most innovative and fascinating album in many years ..."

== Discography ==
=== Albums ===
- Parsec (RKT008), RAKETEmusik/BluNoise, 2002.
- White Spot (RKT012), RAKETEmusik, 2004.
- Health and Welfare (RKT020), RAKETEmusik, 2006.
- Liquid, Strange Ways Records, 2009.
- Boldstriker, Strange Ways/Indigo, 2011.
- All, Tapete Records, 2020
- Objects, Beings & Parrots, Tapete Records/Indigo, 2026

=== EPs ===
- Urlaub in Polen, Institut für Wohlklangforschung, 1999.
- Blue Car Live EP (RKT004), RAKETEmusik, 2000.

=== Miscellaneous ===
- Contributed the track Lotus to RAKETEsampler Vol.2 (RKT003), RAKETEmusic, 2000.
- Split 7" limited edition-single (RKT006; 300 copies only) with German trip hop band Dazerdoreal, RAKETEmusik, 2002.
- Panorama, music video, 2004.
