= Carl Braun Camera-Werk =

German electronics, slide projector and camera maker

Carl Braun Camera-Werk of Nuremberg, Germany, or Braun, as it was more commonly called, was founded as an optical production house. It is best known for its 35mm film cameras named Paxette, and for slide projectors named Paximat.

== History ==
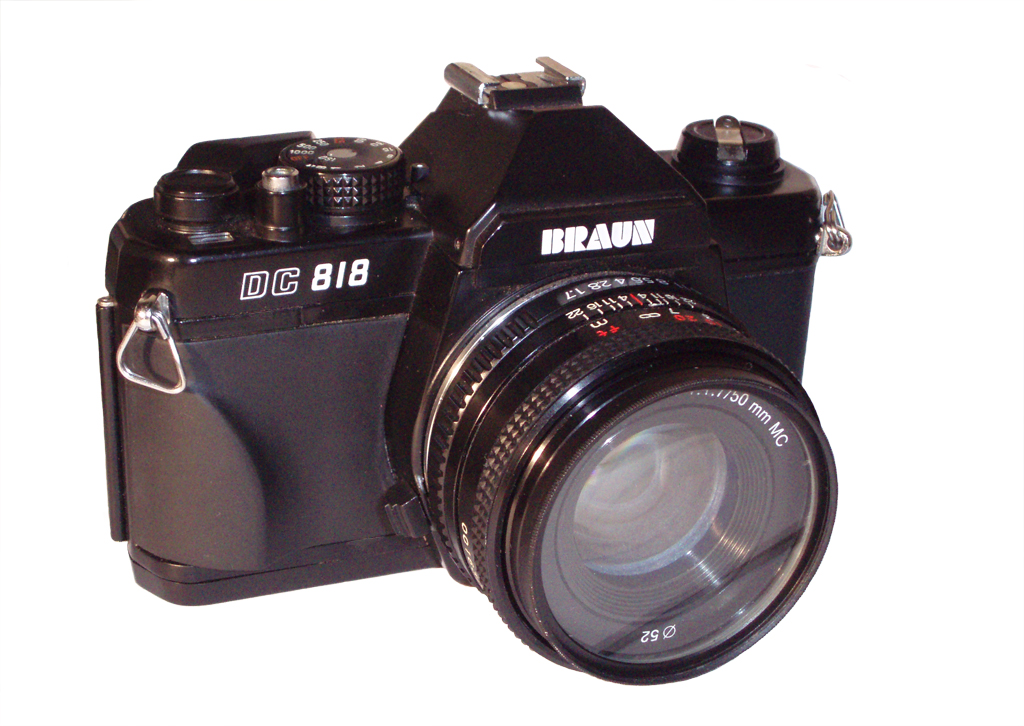
Braun Single-lens reflex camera

The company was founded in 1915 under name of Karl Braun KG, Fabrik optischer Geräte und Metallwaren for the fabrication of optical appliances and metalware. In 1948, the company began producing box film cameras, in rollfilm and 35mm format. It changed its name to Carl Braun Camera-Werke. Its best known model was the Paxette series of 35mm rangefinder cameras. Most of the company's cameras were consumer-level models, though the company did briefly produce several more advanced 35mm rangefinder designs as well as an interesting 35mm single-lens reflex camera line with leaf shutters, the Paxette Reflex (Automatic?)/AMC M335 Reflex. The most advanced of Braun's rangefinders and SLRs had interchangeable lenses.

Braun ceased making cameras in the 1960s, in part because of high labour costs and a resultant inability to compete in the consumer level camera market, a market increasingly supplied by Japanese firms.

Parallel to the camera manufacturing began the development and construction of film slide projectors. In 1955, under the Carl Braun Camera-Werk Nürnberg label, the company introduced one of the first semi-automatic slide projectors with a tray magazine to the consumer market named Paximat. Other innovations included wired or wireless remote control, automatic focus, brighter halogen lamps, and variable brightness control. Since 1955, about 4 million slide projectors have been built and sold in 120 countries around the world under the names Paximat or Novamat.

Although the company was selling more than four million units by 1997, Braun's overall profitability declined precipitously, and in 2000, the company ceased trading. It was reorganized the following year.

In addition to the successful introduction of digital cameras and accessories, in 2003 Braun introduced the Braun Multimag SlideScan 3600 digital scanner for the consumer market. This scanner was based on the Paximat Multimag series of slide projectors, and enables the scanning of slides directly from six different slide trays. New Braun scanners utilize Digital ICE technology.

In 2004, Braun changed its name again. It is now known as Braun Photo Technik GmbH, and continues to sell and/or manufacture slide projectors, other optical goods, and optical business applications.

== Gallery ==
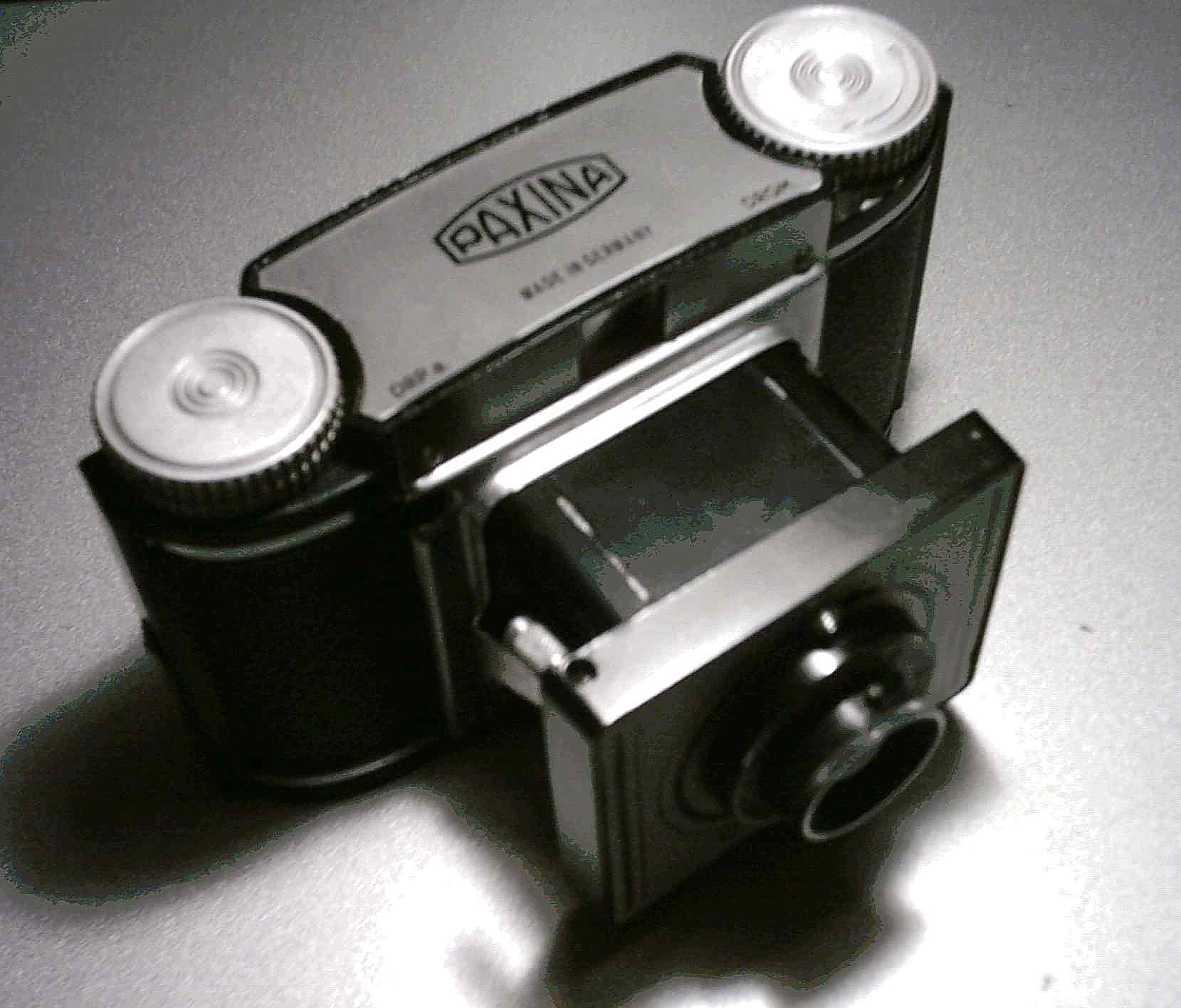
Braun Paxina 6x6

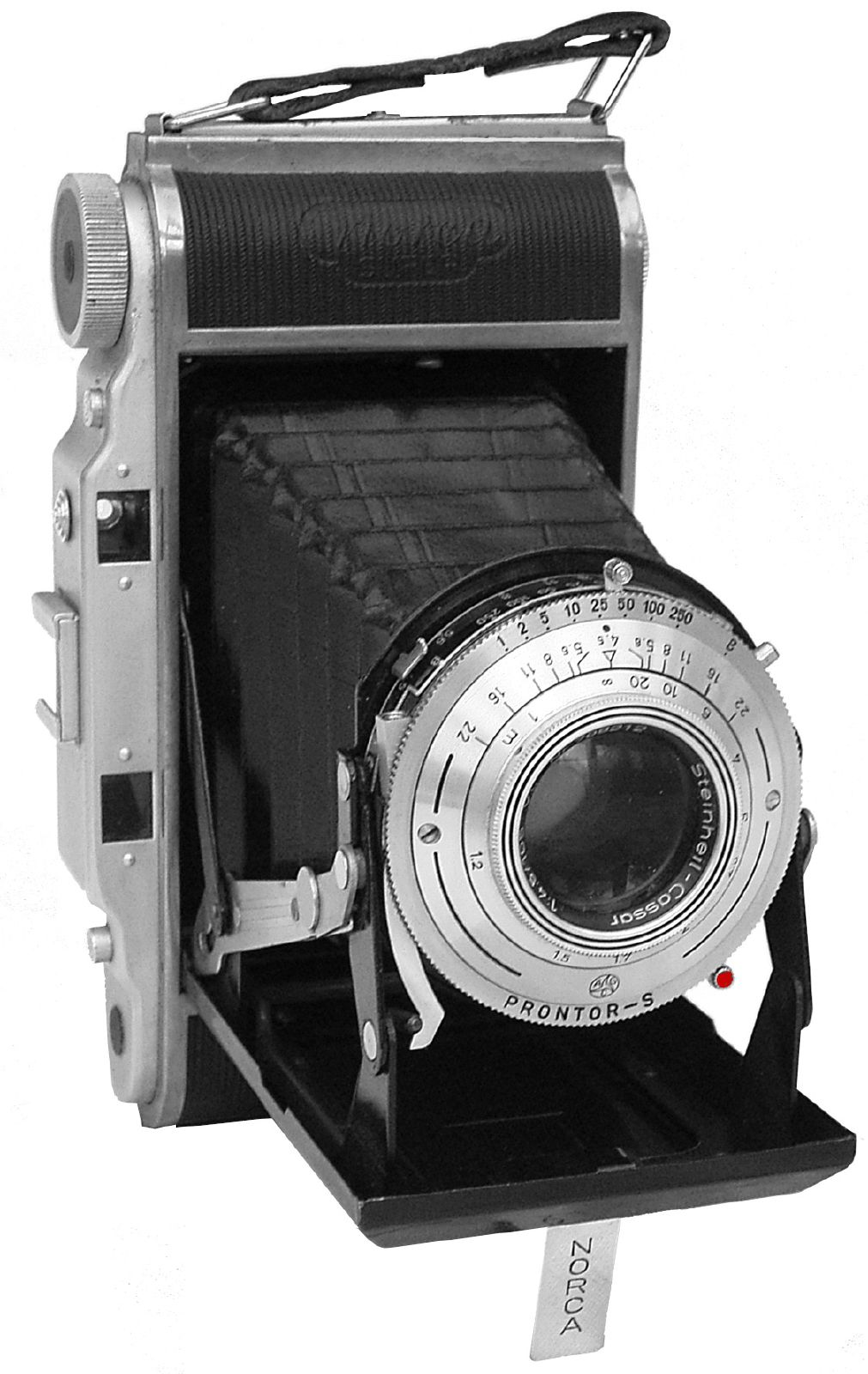
Braun Norca Super

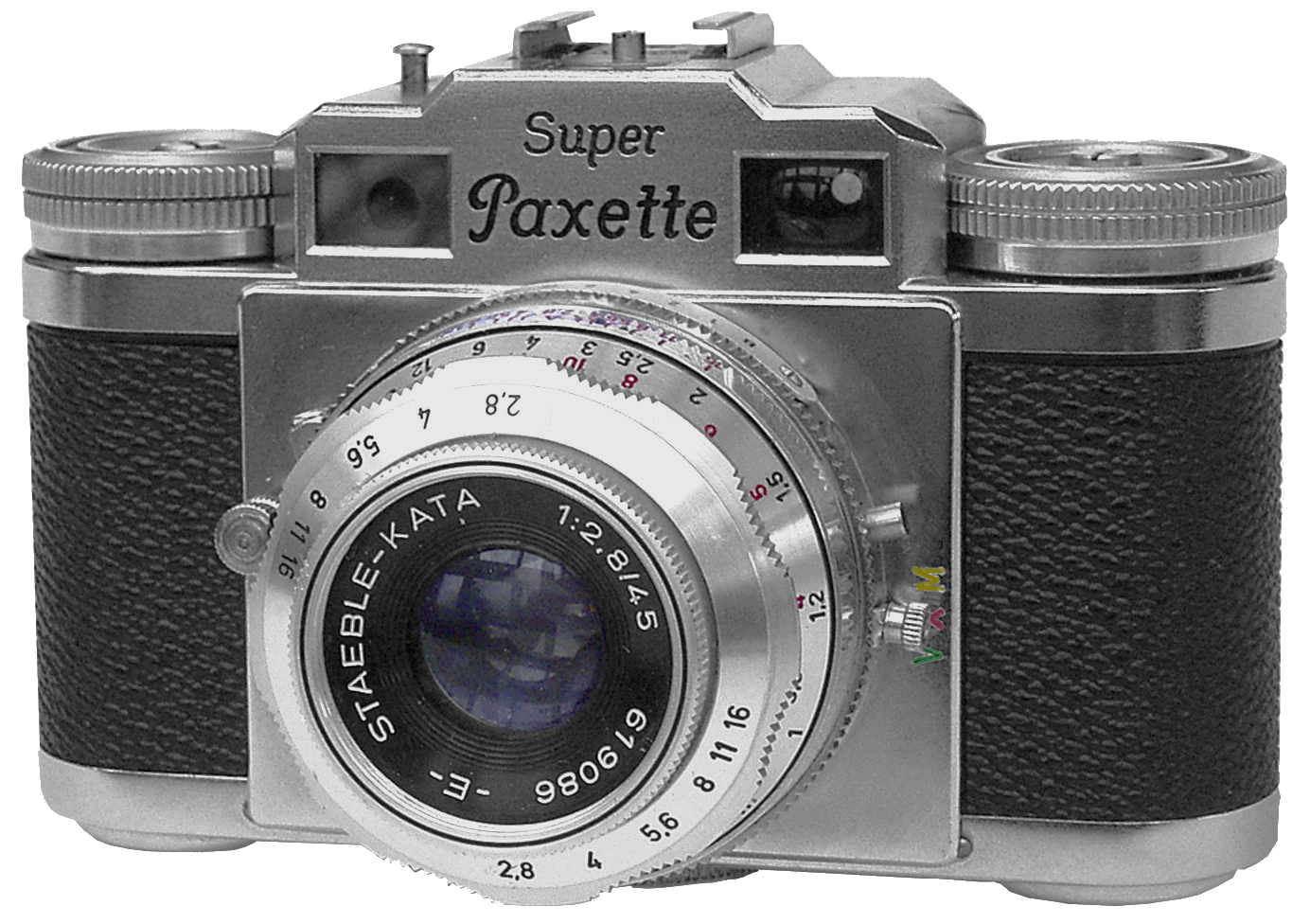
Braun Super Paxette I

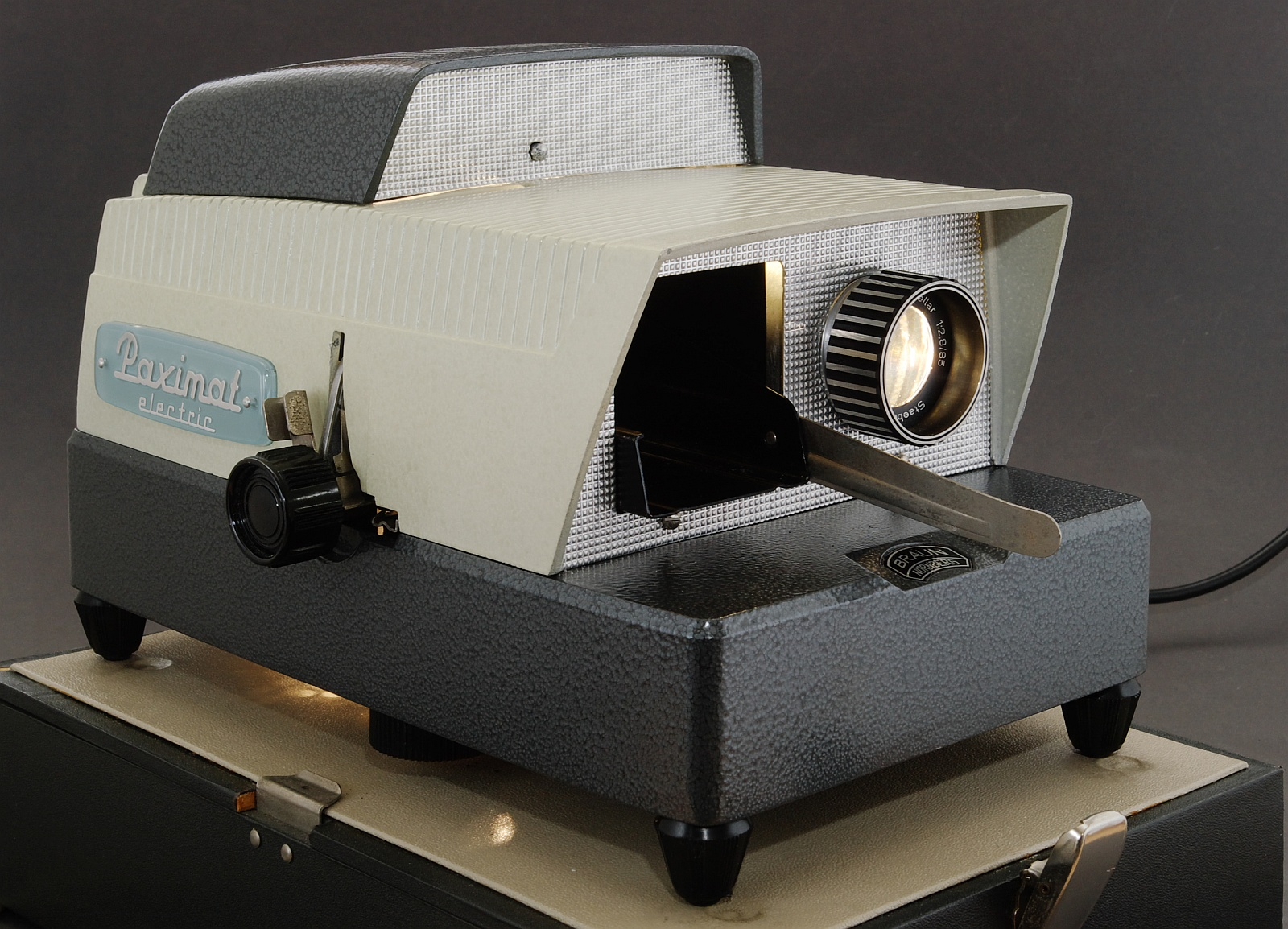
Braun Paximat electric
