= Hans Gugelot =

Indonesian-born German architect and designer

- Born: Johan Gugelot; 1 April 1920; Makassar, Dutch East Indies
- Died: 10 September 1965 (aged 45); Ulm, Germany
- Education: ETH Zurich
- Parent: Pieter Cornelis Gugelot

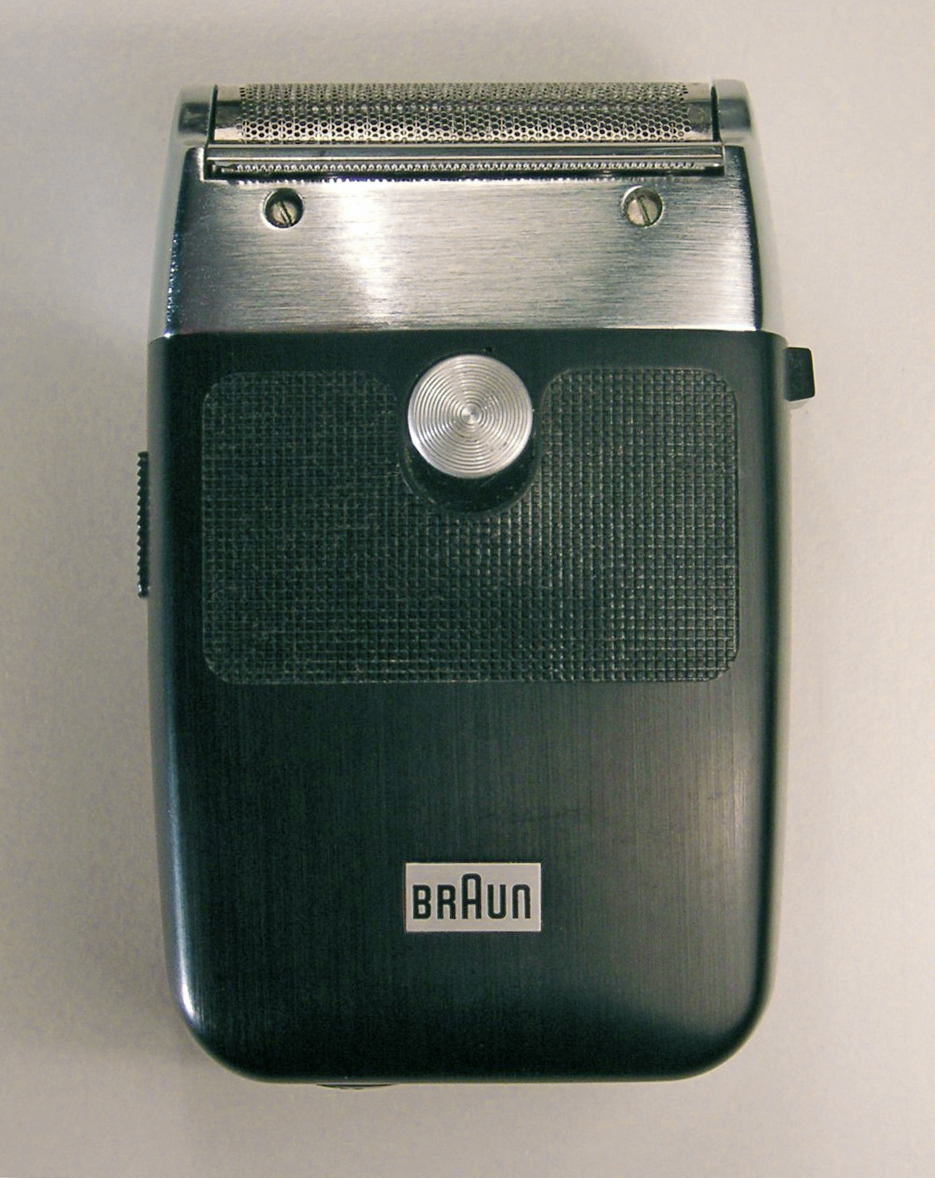
Electric shaver designed for Braun (1962)

Hans Gugelot (1 April 1920 – 10 September 1965) was an Indonesian-born, German engineer and industrial designer known for his modernist consumer products.

== Life and work ==
Johan Gugelot was born on 1 April 1920 in Makassar, Dutch East Indies, to Dutch parents.

He completed his early education in Laren and Hilversum, North Holland.

In 1934, the Gugelot family moved to Davos, Switzerland, for Hans's father's job as a physician.

Between 1940 and 1942 Gugelot studied architecture in Lausanne, and graduated as an architect from Eidgenössische Technische Hochschule (ETH), Zurich in 1946.

Until 1948 he worked as an architect for a number of architects. In 1947, he married.

In 1948, Gugelot was hired by Max Bill, for whom he created his first furniture designs.

In 1950 he founded his own office and began work on the design of the "M125" shelving and storage system for Bofinger, a product for which he later became known.

Gugelot is closely identified with Hochschüle für Gestaltung (HfG) in Ulm, Germany. Another influential work of his from this period is the "Ulm Stool", which he designed in collaboration with Max Bill.

In 1954, Gugelot met Erwin Braun, then-head of German consumer product company, Braun. Throughout the remainder of the decade, he created a number of designs for the company such as the Braun SK 4 radiogram (known as "Snow White's Coffin"), which he designed with Dieter Rams and Herbert Lindinger.

He also designed a slide projector (the Carousel-S, a professional model sold only in Germany) for Kodak in 1962. The design is held in the collection of the Museum of Modern Art (MoMA), in New York. Gugelot died of a heart attack in 1965.

== Gallery ==
Notable works

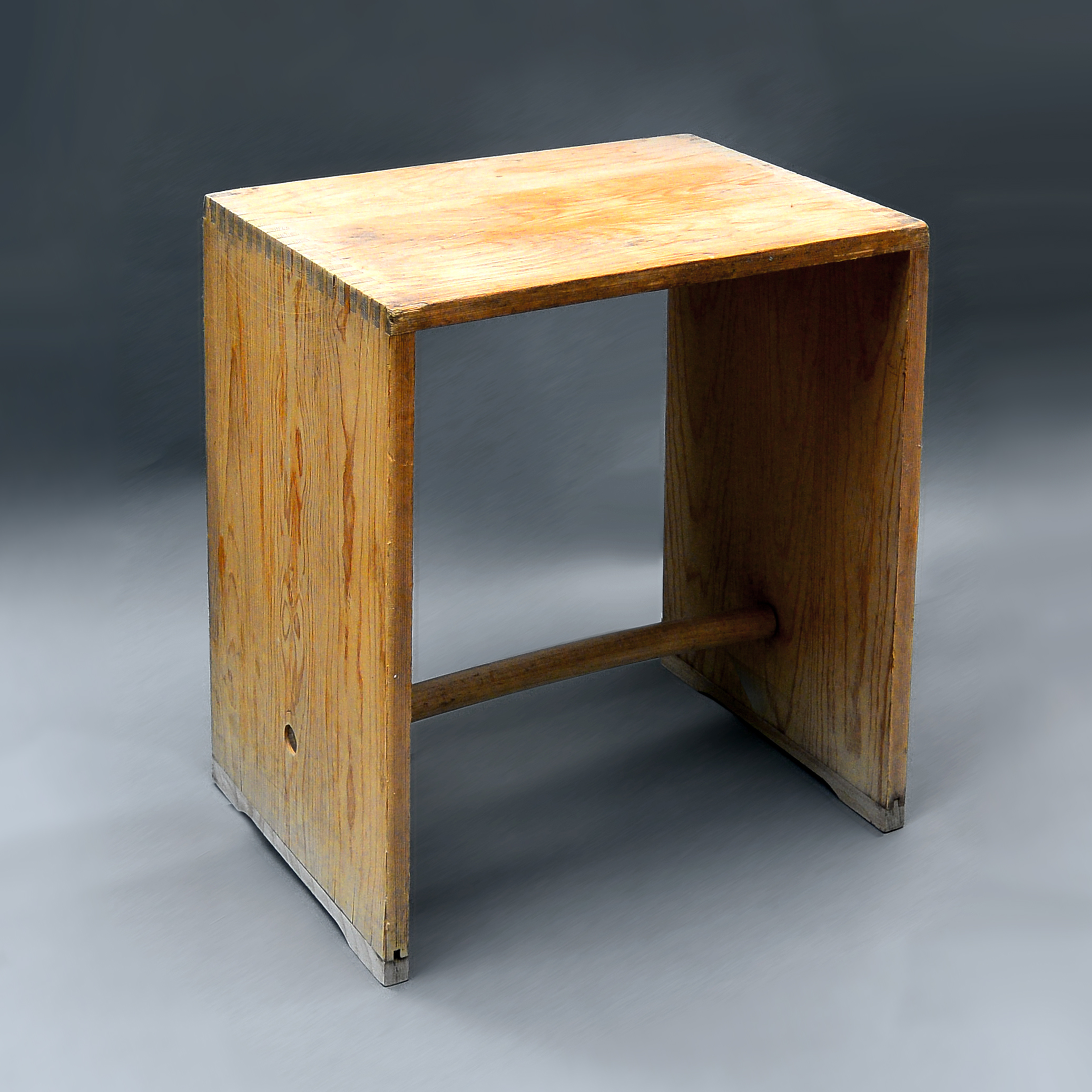
Ulm Stool (1954)

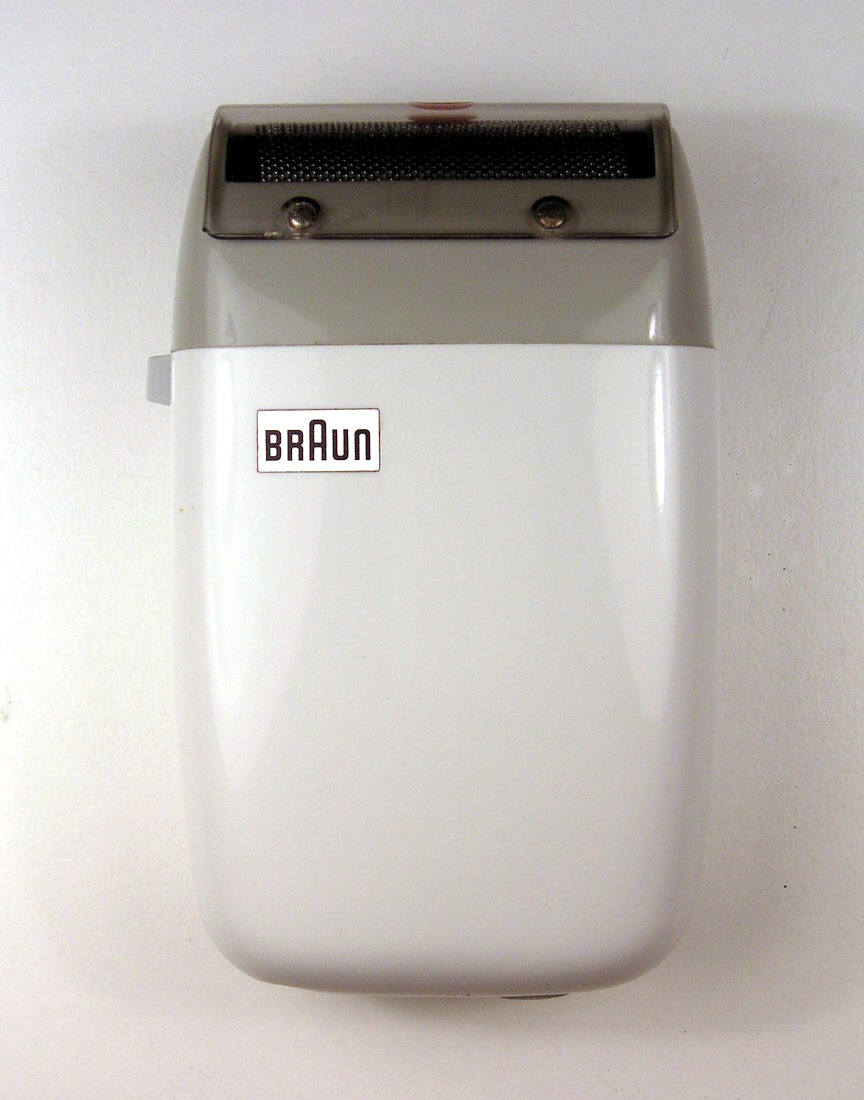
Braun SM 2 shaver (1963)

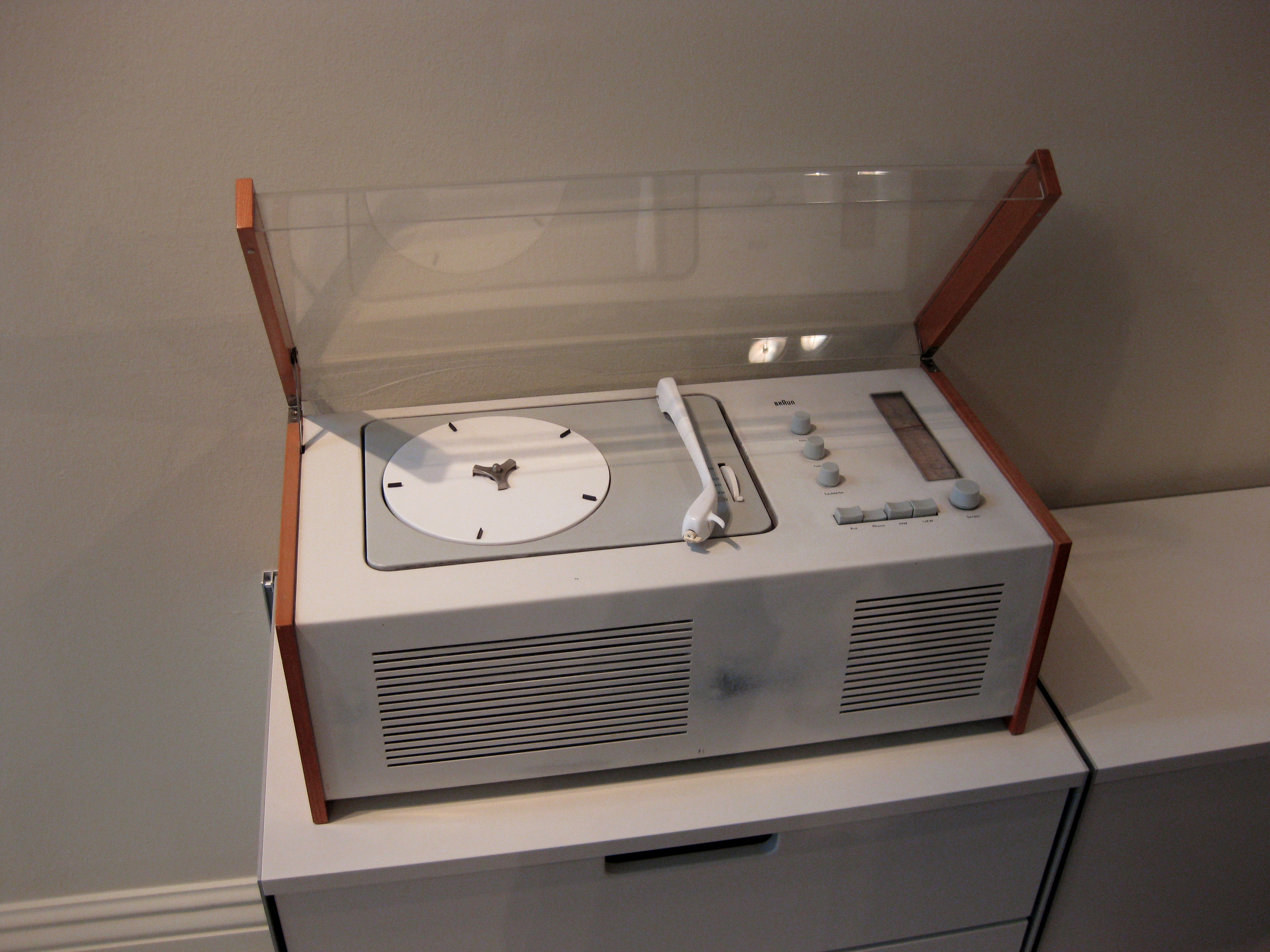
SK 4/10 "Snow White's Coffin" Radio-Phonograph for Braun (1956)

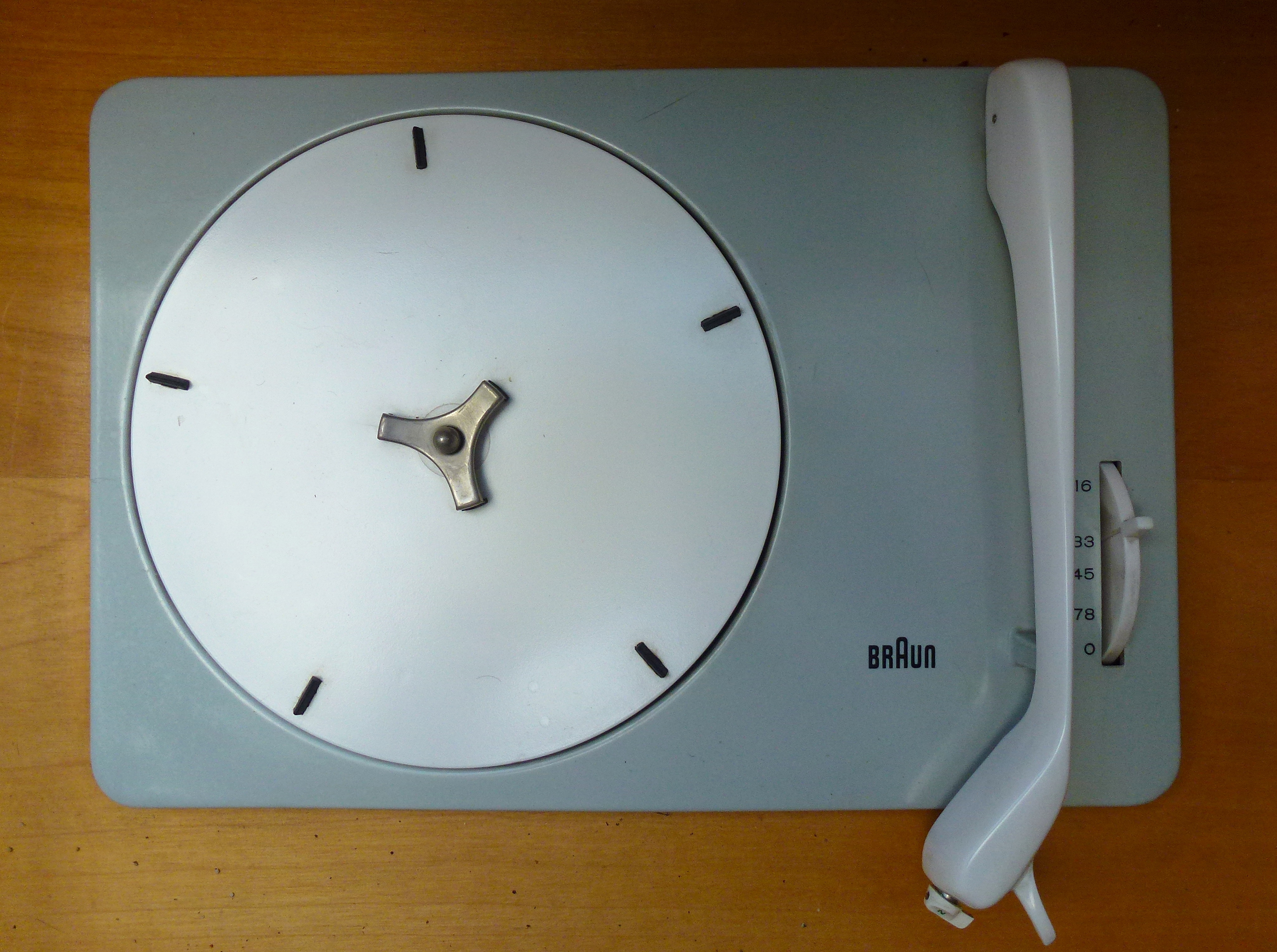
Braun turntable

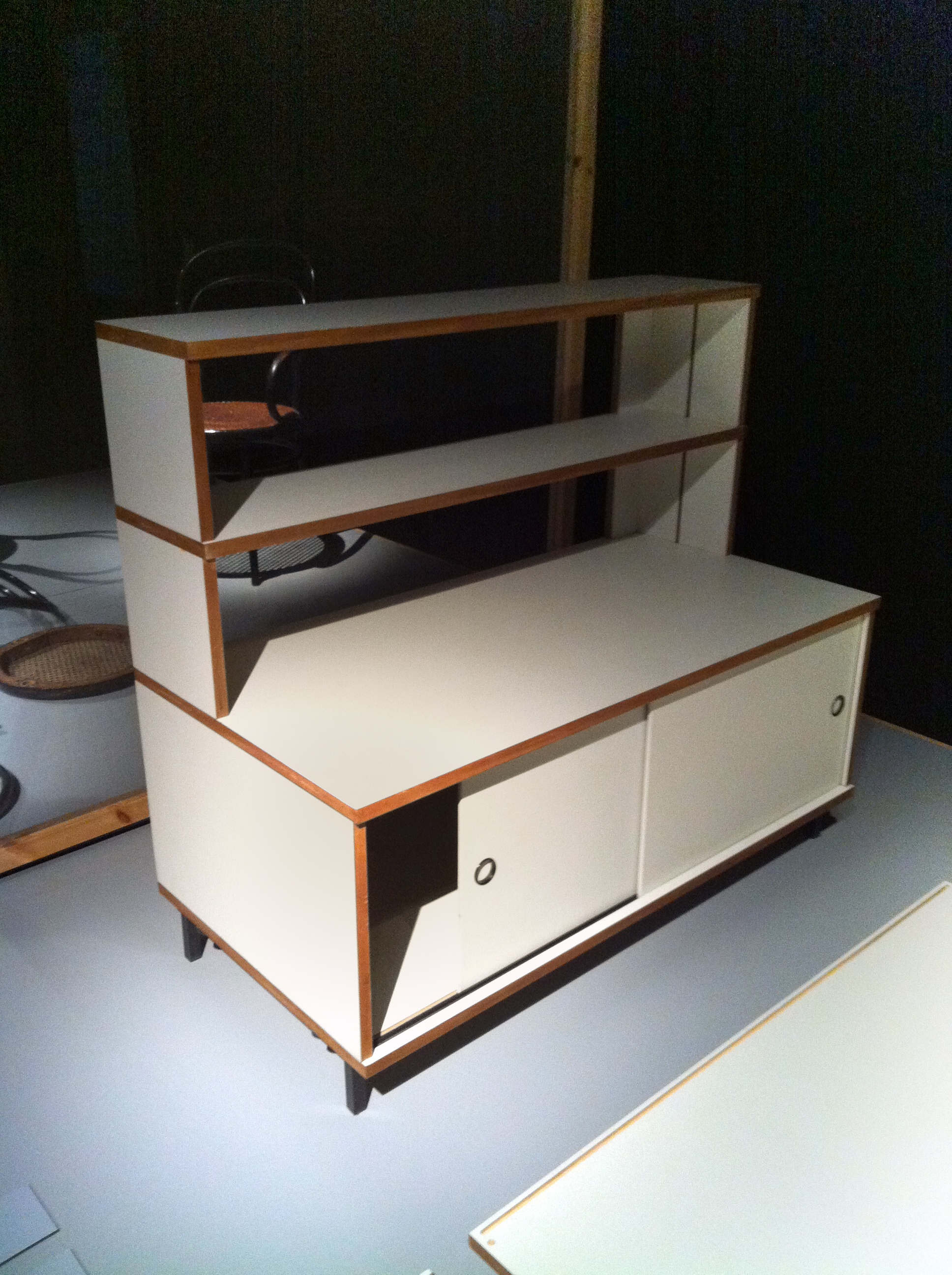
M125 storage system (1956)

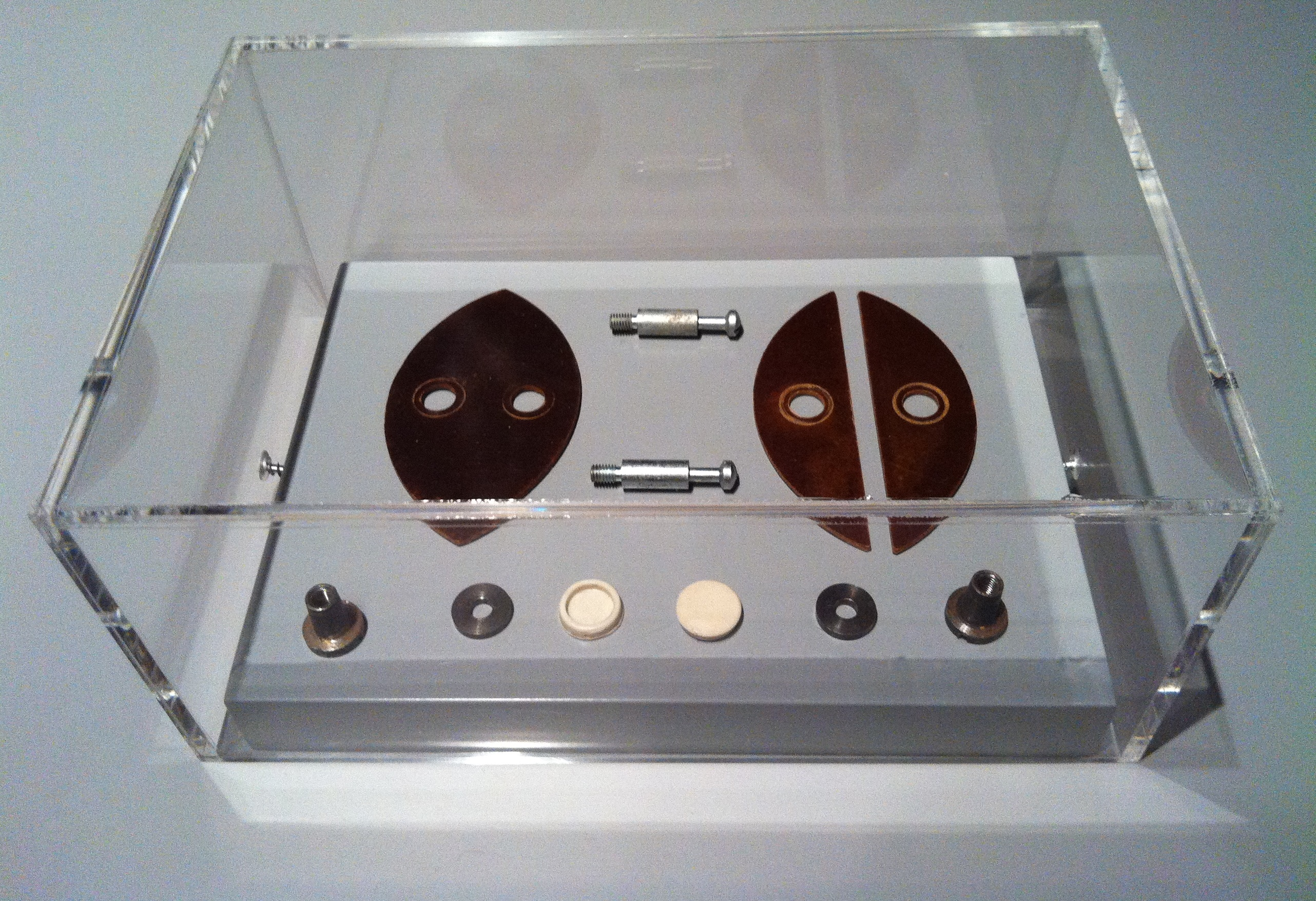
M125 system (details)
