= The Winter of Our Discontent (album) =

Studio album by the Echoing Green
- Released: April 14, 2003
- Recorded: The Echoing Green, Albuquerque, New Mexico
- Genre: Synth-pop
- Length: 51:14
- Label: A Different Drum
- Producer: Joey Belville

The Echoing Green chronology
Fall Awake (2003)	The Winter of Our Discontent (2003)	The Story of Our Lives (2004)

Professional ratings
Review scores
Source	Rating
The Phantom Tollbooth (original version)	4/5 stars
The Phantom Tollbooth (BEC Recordings version)	4.5/5 stars

The Winter of Our Discontent is an album by the Echoing Green, originally released on April 14, 2003, on A Different Drum. The album was released to Europe with a slightly different track listing in 2004 through Infacted Recordings, and through BEC Recordings on December 14, 2004, with another slightly different track listing.

== Track listings ==
=== Original release ===
1. "Daybreak" (Joey Belville) – 1:26
2. "The Story of Our Lives" (Belville) – 5:30
3. "Fall Awake" (Belville) – 5:56
4. "Apology" (Belville, Chrissy Jeter) – 4:37
5. "Bittersweet" (Trey Many) – 5:36
6. "Starling" (Jeter, Belville) – 5:07
7. "Blind" (Belville) – 4:13
8. "Someday" (Belville, Jeter) – 5:06
9. "Heidi's Song" (Belville) – 3:54
10. "New Gold Dream (81, 82, 83, 84)" (Kerr, Burchill, McNeil, Forbes) – 4:37
11. "Winter" (Belville, Jeter) – 5:07

=== Infacted Recordings version ===
1. "Daybreak" – 1:26
2. "The Story of Our Lives" – 5:30
3. "Fall Awake" – 5:56
4. "Apology" – 4:37
5. "Bittersweet" – 5:36
6. "Starling" – 5:07
7. "Blind" – 4:13
8. "Someday" – 5:06
9. "Heidi's Song" – 3:54
10. "Seaside" (Belville, Jeter) – 3:05
11. "The Story of Our Lives" (Syrian Remix) – 5:08
12. "The Story of Our Lives" (Echo Image Remix) – 5:10

=== BEC Recordings version ===
1. "Daybreak" – 1:26
2. "The Story of Our Lives" – 5:30
3. "Fall Awake" – 5:56
4. "Apology" – 4:37
5. "Bittersweet" – 5:36
6. "Seaside" – 3:05
7. "Starling" – 5:07
8. "Blind" – 4:13
9. "Someday" – 5:06
10. "Epiphany" (George Robison, Belville) – 4:12
11. "The Sparrows and the Nightingales" (Reinhardt, Heppner) – 3:55
12. "Winter" – 5:07
13. "The Story of Our Lives" (Echo Image Remix) – 5:10

== Personnel ==
- Joey Belville – programming, vocals
- Chrissy Jeter – vocals
- Dave Adams – drums on "Seaside"
- Fox Fletcher – guitar on "Seaside"
- Jenna London – soprano vocals on "The Story of Our Lives"
- Jason Smith – additional piano on "Someday"
- Rusty Wiseman – guitar on "New Gold Dream (81, 82, 83, 84)"
