= Supernova (The Echoing Green album) =

Studio album by The Echoing Green
- Released: September 19, 2000
- Recorded: Joey's house, Santa Fe Center Studios, Black Dog Studios, and The Border
- Genre: Electronica
- Length: 47:05
- Label: Red Hill Records
- Producers: Jerome Fontamillas and Joey Belville

The Echoing Green chronology
Oceanaria v1.0 (2000)	Supernova (2000)	Music from the Ocean Picture (2001)

Professional ratings
Review scores
Source	Rating
Allmusic	3/5 stars
The Phantom Tollbooth	4.5/5 stars

Supernova is an album by The Echoing Green. It primarily features brand-new material, along with a few reworked tracks from previous recordings. The cover art of the album features dishes of the Very Large Array in central New Mexico.

== Track listing ==
1. "Supernova" (Joey Belville, Jerome Fontamillas, Jesse Dworak) – 5:26
2. "Yesterday's Taking Over" (Belville) – 3:32
3. "She's Gone Tragic" new version (Belville, Dworak) – 4:21
4. "Liberation" (Belville, Chrissy Franklin, David Adams, Dworak) – 4:52
5. "Waterfall" (Belville, Fontamillas) – 5:02
6. "Thief" new version (Belville, Franklin, Adams) – 4:14
7. "December" (Belville, Dworak) – 4:35
8. "Jubilation (This Thing Called Life)" (Claude S.) – 4:53
9. "Defender" new version (Belville, Adams) – 4:13
10. "Nightfall & Splendor" (Jyro Xhan) – 5:51

== Credits ==
- Joey Belville – vocals, programming
- Chrissy Franklin – vocals
- Jesse Dworak – programming
- David Adams – drums, programming
- Kevin Robinson – guitar
- Micah Ortega – turntables
- Marsh Shaumburger – acoustic guitar on "She's Gone Tragic"
- Tresa Jordan – backing vocals on "Nightfall & Splendor"
