= Delaware (band) =

Norwegian rock band

- Also known as: Beyond
- Origin: Drammen, Norway
- Genre: Indie rock/Alternative pop
- Years active: 1999–present
- Labels: Strange Ways, Metropolis Records, MTG
- Members: Richard Holmsen; Jon Fredrik "Joffe" Torgersen; Morten Ødegaard Skaret; Petter Laugerud
- Past members: Ronny Andreassen (bass)

Delaware is a Norwegian indie/alternative rock band from Drammen.

== History ==
=== Early history: Beginnings as Beyond ===
Delaware started out in 1994 in Drammen, Norway as Beyond, a punk/hardcore band who later developed a more pop/melancholic rock sound. Their original line-up consisted of Jon Fredrik "Joffe" Torgersen on vocals, Jørgen Nøvik on drums, Ronny Andreassen on bass, Erik Lauritzen on guitars and Kyrre Bekkelund on guitars. A year later, inspired by British “indie” rock from the 90s, the band began recording their first demo, Icons, while Richard Holmsen and Petter Laugerud replaced Lauritzen, shortly after Nøvik had moved on from the band to become a professional snowboarder and start his own music and art projects. Eager to get their music heard, Beyond self-released their debut and sold it in local shops and concerts. Their underground fan base began to grow.

In 1998, Beyond recorded their follow-up, Polyphonic, which they believed could be their major breakthrough. Before it could be released, a problem arose and the band had an important decision to make. Kyrre decided to leave the band to dedicate his time to his schooling. Feeling that they could not continue without him, Beyond disbanded and Polyphonic was scrapped.

The ex-members of Beyond decided to record another demo under the name of Delaware without Kyrre. The idea was to simplify the music – become a pop band and say in three minutes what Beyond said in seven. The band quickly earned recognition through major radio stations and websites in Norway.

=== 2001 - 2006 ===
In 2001, Delaware was signed to Sony Columbia in Germany, who released the band’s debut album, ...And Everything Reminds Me, in 2003. However, prior to its release, Ronny Andreassen left the band and was replaced by Morten Ødegaard Skaret. Quickly reaching critical acclaim in Germany and Norway, the band toured Europe both as a headliner and as a support act. Not happy with the way Sony Germany promoted the album, Delaware left Sony in search of another label. Sadly this happened at the time the album was to be released on Sony Norway and the branch pulled the plug on its promotion.

=== Since 2006 ===
Shortly after leaving the major, Delaware found their new home with the label Strangeways, also in Germany. While recording their second album, the band decided to use their rehearsal space in Drammen and only record the drums in a proper studio. This went against their method for the first album, in which they strived for perfection. Lost in the Beauty of Innocence would prove to be a much more ‘real’ sounding album through the way in which they approached the recording process and the fact that they deliberately kept the errors in the takes. Delaware called upon longtime fan Alex Møklebust to produce the album.

After hearing a demo of the new album, Metropolis Records decided to sign the band for North America. Both Strangeways and Metropolis released Lost in the Beauty of Innocence in 2006.

As of 2007 Delaware was writing songs for their third album.

== Members ==
- Richard Holmsen - Vocals/Guitars
- Jon Fredrik "Joffe" Torgersen - Vocals/Guitars
- Morten Ødegaard Skaret - bass
- Petter Laugerud - Drums/Percussion

=== Former members ===
- Ronny Andreassen - bass

== Discography ==
- Lost in the Beauty of Innocence (Strange Ways, February 10, 2006)

Produced by Alex Møklebust and partly recorded in the band's rehearsal room, two singles from Lost in the Beauty of Innocence were released from the album, "Wish for" and "The Fourteenth".

1. The Fourteenth
2. Cs
3. A Butterfly Kiss
4. Let them go
5. Loss
6. Evolve
7. To the Unsung
8. For what reason
9. Wish for
10. Unfold
11. You
12. With Fear And Anticipation

- ...And Everything Reminds Me (Sony BMG, June 2, 2003)

1. Everything Sometimes
2. Secret
3. Crevice
4. Always
5. Though
6. Decision
7. Lack of
8. Last Night
9. Both Sides
10. About You
11. As Teens

== The band's name ==
Delaware is named after the American state Delaware, but the band originally chose the name from an album by the band Drop Nineteens called Delaware.

== Music videos ==
- "Always" music video
- "The Fourteenth" music video, directed by Kenneth Hjellum
- "Lack Of" music video, directed by NRK

== Related projects ==
- Richard Holmsen has a solo project where he performs mostly acoustic songs in the vein of Nick Drake, Jeff Buckley or Iron & Wine.
- Morten Ødegaard Skaret also plays in several hardcore bands, including Don't Cry Wolf and BBCs
- Richard Holmsen was a part of the electronica project SEA from 1996-1998.
