= Die Flut =

Flut or Die Flut (German "the flood") may refer to:

- Die Flut, 1937 poem by Moriz Seeler
- Die Flut, a 1946 “radio opera” by Boris Blacher
- "Die Flut", song by Joachim Witt and Peter Heppner
