= Carousel slide projector =

Slide projector that uses a rotary tray to store the slides

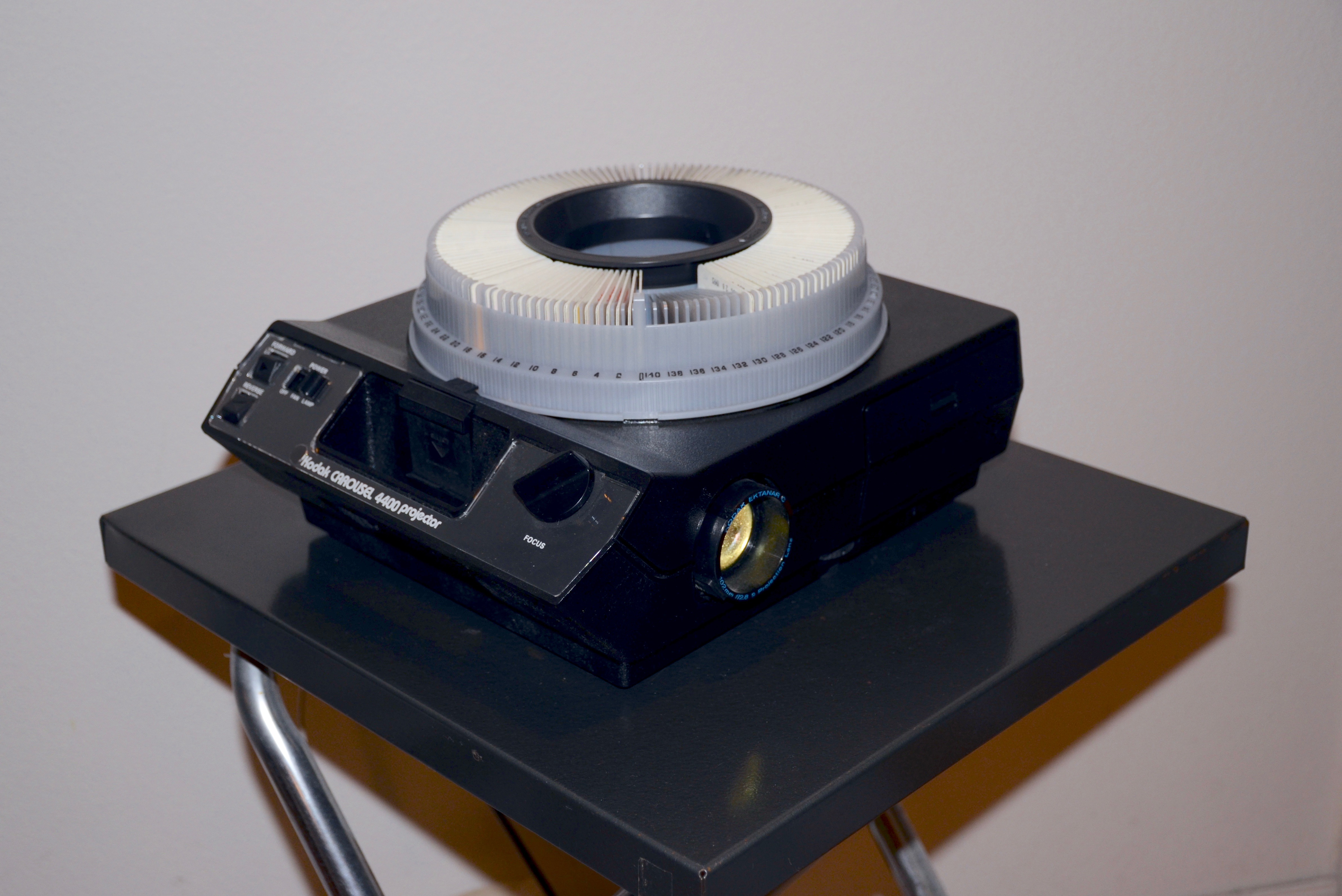
A carousel slide projector. The example pictured is a Kodak Carousel model 4400, dating from the mid-1980s.

A carousel slide projector is a slide projector that uses a rotary tray to store slides, used to project slide photographs and to create slideshows. It was first patented on May 11, 1965, by David E. Hansen of Fairport, New York. Hansen was an industrial designer at the Eastman Kodak Company. A patent for the rotary tray was granted in 1966 after a 1962 application by the Eastman Kodak Company.

The original concept for the carousel slide projector is credited to Italian-American Louis Misuraca, who brought his design to the Kodak company, and sold it for a lump sum. Kodak released their first Carousel projector, the Model 550, in 1961 and sold it until 1966. The 1963 Carousel Model S (Carousel-S), a professional model sold only in Germany, was designed by Hans Gugelot and Reinhold Häcker for Kodak AG in Stuttgart and is in the permanent collection of the Museum of Modern Art.

== Physical form ==
A separate, circular tray holds several (usually 80 or 140) 35mm slides, and is filled with each slide placed in upside down and backwards, so that the image is projected with the correct orientation. The tray is in a horizontal orientation, like a merry-go-round or carousel, whence the name. The tray has a metal plate on the bottom with an opening approximately 5 millimetres (0.20 in) wide, barely large enough to pass a single slide to the projection gate below it.

The projector body contains a motor which rotates the plastic main body of the tray (containing the slides) while the metal plate is fixed with the opening over the projection gate. As the tray is advanced, a reciprocating mechanism lifts the currently loaded slide back up into the tray, then the tray is rotated, dropping the next slide into position between the light source and lens. A shutter in the projector closed during slide changes; on projectors built from 1981 on, that shutter remained closed when no slide was in the gate.

A common series of carousel projectors with a horizontally mounted tray was introduced in the spring of 1962 by Kodak (Kodak Carousel/Ektagraphic). The earliest Carousel models (mostly known as the 500-series) are compatible only with the 80-slide trays.

The Kodak system offered three advantages over the straight-tray, horizontal-feed systems that were then common on the market. The Carousel tray held slides in place with a locking ring on its hub, preventing slides from accidentally spilling out of the tray if it was dropped. By using gravity to lower the slide into the projector, the chance of jamming was greatly reduced, since a warped slide would not descend past the point at which it encountered resistance in the mechanism. The circular tray also enabled the projector to display automated shows without the need to manually reset the slide tray between performances.

Kodak also offered a stack loader that allowed running a stack of up to 40 slides without using a tray, but forward only; and clip sets holding up to 36 slides per clip. A box of 12 clips could store up to 432 slides, and keep them organized.

A more robust version, the Ektagraphic Carousel projector, was produced for the industrial and trade show market. It was basically the same projector, but designed for operation for events lasting for days or weeks. It was available with a zoom lens, enabling the projector to be positioned away from the middle of the audience.

During the 1970s, Kodak also produced a Pocket Carousel projector for use with miniature 110 format Kodachrome and Ektachrome slides.

The Kodak Carousel projector was discontinued in October 2004.

=== Vertical carousel variants ===
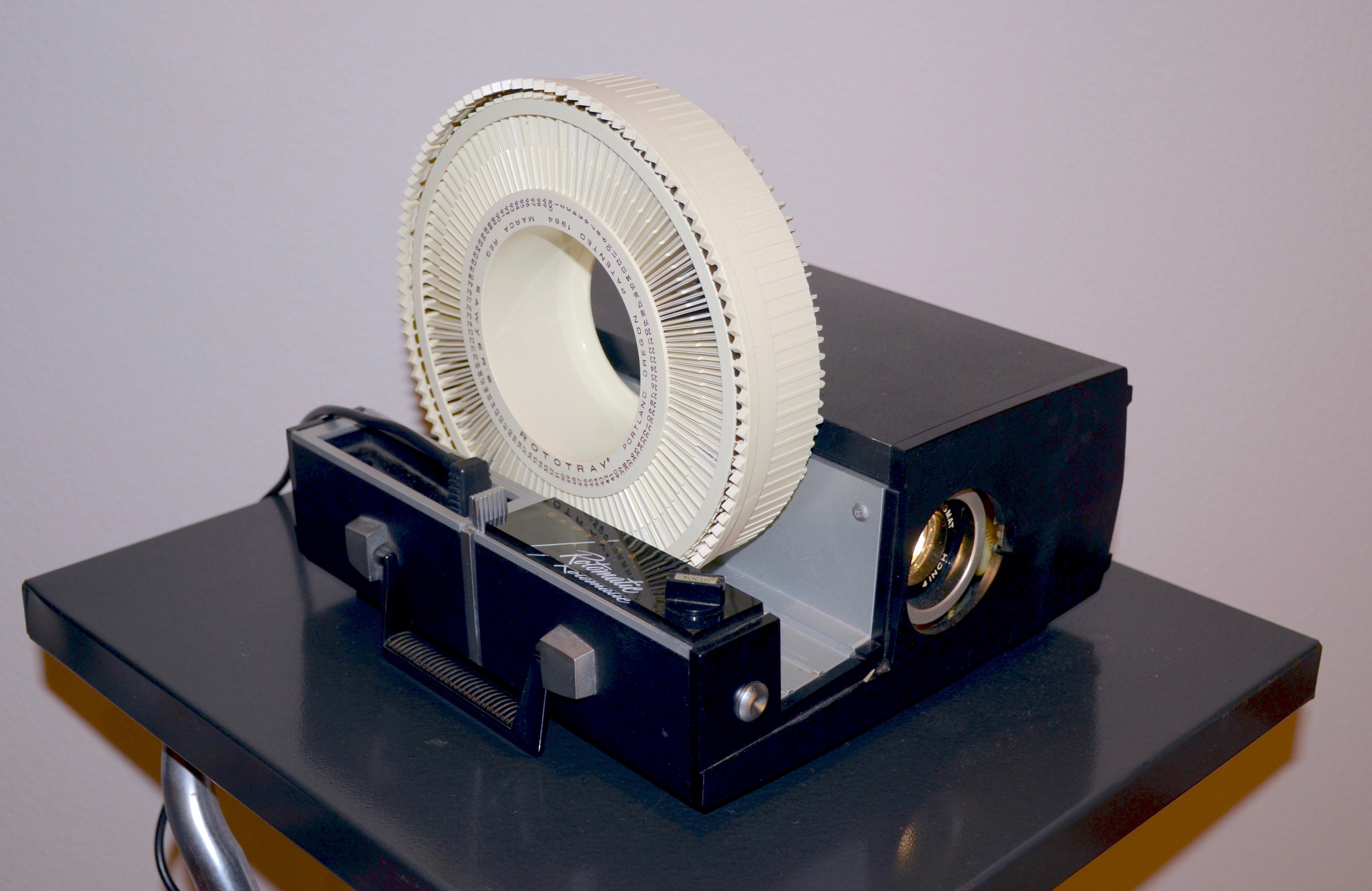
The Sawyer's Rotomatic slide projector was introduced in 1963.

Less well-known but plentiful is a family of projectors based around a design originated by Sawyer's and later sold under other brand names. That manufacturer's first slide projectors, in the late 1950s, had used straight trays. In 1963, Sawyer's Rotomatic, the first version using circular trays (called Rototrays), was introduced. These are distinguished from Kodak Carousel projectors by the round tray being in an upright orientation, like a Ferris wheel. Unlike the Carousel tray's use of a locking collar to hold the slide in the tray, the Rototray held slides in place using friction and a metal spring against the side of each slide.

Projectors using the 100-slide Rototray were backward-compatible with the Bell & Howell TDC-Universal straight slide trays that had been popular since the late 1950s. The 1960s would also see the introduction of a plethora of less popular tray designs, most incompatible with each other, introduced by manufacturers possibly hoping to profit from the razor-and-blades business model.

== Nomenclature and history ==
The first Kodak Carousel projector was targeted toward the consumer and carried the model designation '550'. In 1963, the first professionally oriented model was marketed in Germany as the Model S. Other models include:

- 1964–72: Carousel 800 (consumer)
- 1967–69: Ektagraphic (professional)
- 1969–71: Ektagraphic AF, E, and B (professional)
- 1971–84: Ektagraphic E-2, B2, F-2, AF-3 (professional)
- 1972–81: Carousel 'H' (models 600H, 650H, 750H, 760H, 850H, consumer)
- 1975–84: Ektagraphic AF-2K, AF-1
- 1979–84: Ektagraphic B-2AR, S-AV 1020, 1030, 2000, 2030, 2050
- 1981–2004: Carousel 4000, 4200, 4400, 4600, 5200, 5400, 5600
- 1981–2004: Ektagraphic III (E plus, A, AMT, ATS, Br, ABR)
- 1992–2004: Ektapro (320, 3000, 9020)
- 1992–2004: Ektalite (1000, 1500, 2000)

The manufacturing date may be decoded using the CAMEROSITY code, which is a four or six-letter code which corresponds to the month and year (four-letter) or month, day, and year (six-letter) of manufacture, using the substitution cipher C=1, A=2, M=3, E=4, R=5, O=6, S=7, I=8, T=9, Y=0. The code is located either on a silver label inside the cord storage compartment or pressed into the plastic of the bottom-mounted cord wrap.

== In popular culture ==
The Kodak Carousel slide projector was part of the plot of the 2007 episode "The Wheel" in season 1 of the TV series Mad Men. In the episode, the advertising agency comes up with the name "Carousel", in place of the Kodak executives' name for it, "The Wheel", pitching the device as a nostalgic conveyance that let its viewers travel through their memories as a child would, "around and around and back home again to a place where we know we are loved". In reality Kodak's advertising at the time concentrated on the features of the device.

A Carousel S model appears in episode 1 of the Netflix German series, Cassandra.
