= The Echoing Green (band) =

American electronic music/synthpop band

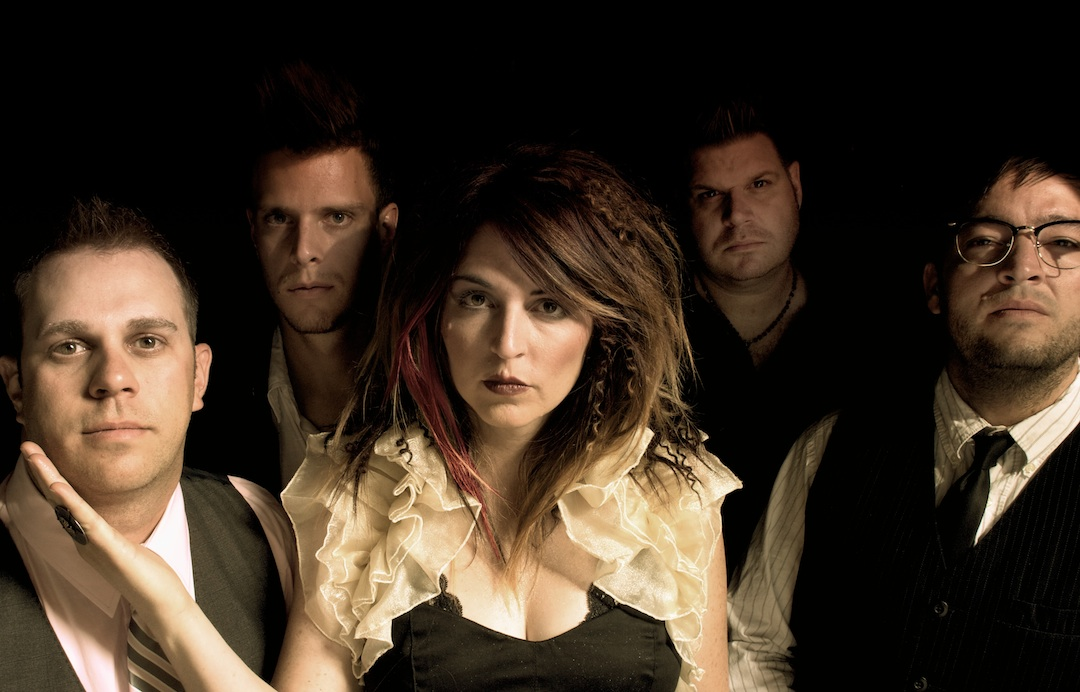
- The Echoing Green promotional photo

Background information
- Origin: Albuquerque, New Mexico, United States
- Genres: Electronica, synthpop, dark wave
- Years active: 1992–present
- Members: Dave Adams; John Ball; Joey Belville; Will Foster; Chrissy Jeter
- Past members: Aaron Bowman; Jessy Dworak
- Website: echoing.green

The Echoing Green is an electronic music and synthpop band. It began as a duo between Joey Belville and Aaron Bowman in 1992, and has since released eleven major albums.

== History ==
Belville, a devout Christian, created the band with a focus on faith and self-funding rather than having label. Their lyrics are infused with a strong element of faith and biblical themes. Christian artists also make occasional appearances. For instance, Riki Michele provided vocals on "Defend Your Joy", though she was uncredited for the part. Supernova managed to gain a label and recognition, the band mostly works with word of mouth.

A remix of the song "Oxygen" from Hope Springs Eternal appeared on the Sci-Fi Channel's show First Wave.

On February 21, 2011, the band announced their completion of mastering on In Scarlet and Vile, which later went to release on March 11, 2011.

Belville has produced and mixed other bands such as Leiahdorus and System22.

== Discography ==
=== Studio albums ===
- Defend Your Joy (1994)
- Hope Springs Eternal (1997)
- The Echoing Green / The W's Split EP (1998)
- The Echoing Green (1998)
- Supernova (2000)
- Music from the Ocean Picture (2001)
- The Winter of Our Discontent (2003)
- In Scarlet and Vile (2011)

=== Remix albums ===
- Aurora 7.2 (1995)
- Science Fiction (1996) (re-issued in 2001)
- The Evergreen Annex - Remix Addendum (2002)

=== Live albums ===
- Glimmer of Hope (1999) (Recorded Live At TOM Fest '98)

=== Compilation albums ===
- Electronica (1998)
- Oceanaria v1.0 (2000)
- The Evergreen Collection (2002)
- Songs of Innocence and Experience - Hope and Science (2006 reissue of Hope Springs Eternal and Science Fiction)
- The Echoing Green - Violent Whispers- Songs & Secrets from The Echoing Green (Compilation, best-of album 2020)

=== Singles ===
- "If I Could..." (1999)
- "She's Gone Tragic" (2000)
- "Fall Awake" (2003)
- "The Story of Our Lives" (2004)
- "Suffer" (2007)
- "Sanctuary" (2008)
