= Wolfsheim (band) =

German synthpop duo

- Peter Heppner (left) and Markus Reinhardt (right)

Background information
- Origin: Hamburg, Germany
- Genres: Dark wave; synthpop
- Years active: 1987–2004
- Labels: Strange Ways; Metropolis
- Past members: Pompejo Ricciardi; Oliver Reinhardt; Peter Heppner; Markus Reinhardt

Wolfsheim (German pronunciation: [ˈvɔlfshaɪm]) was a German synthpop duo from Hamburg that consisted of Markus Reinhardt and Peter Heppner. Although never officially disbanded, Wolfsheim has been inactive since 2005 due to a dispute between the two members, which even led to trials in 2007 and 2008 that forbade either member to continue Wolfsheim without the other. The band's musical style takes cues from the 1980s New Romanticism and new wave, usually considered synthpop or darkwave. They are best known for their singles "The Sparrows and the Nightingales" (1991), "Once in a Lifetime" (1998) and "Kein Zurück" (2003). Their lyrics tend to be melancholic, but at the same time modernist.

== History ==
The band was founded in 1987 by Markus Reinhardt and Pompejo Ricciardi and was named after Meyer Wolfsheim, a fictional character from F. Scott Fitzgerald's novel The Great Gatsby. Markus' brother Oliver joined the band some time afterward. After co-founder Ricciardi left the band and was replaced by Peter Heppner who had known the band members from mutual friends and from growing up in the same neighborhood in Hamburg-Wilhelmsburg, they produced their first demo tape Ken Manage in 1988. Their first performance was at Werkstatt 3, a small club in Hamburg. Oliver Reinhardt left the band, leading to the band's definitive lineup of Markus Reinhardt (music) and Peter Heppner (lyrics and vocals).

After making a second demo tape Any But Pretty (1989), Wolfsheim applied at various labels to no avail, until they caught the attention of the one-man independent record label Strange Ways Records. Wolfsheim's "The Sparrows and the Nightingales" (1991), was the first single to be released on Strange Ways. The song became a fast hit, even though it was not heavily promoted. Their debut album No Happy View (1992) was also released on Strange Ways and did well in the charts. The follow-up Popkiller (1993) reached the German Media Control Charts, albeit at a low position. In February 1995, Wolfsheim released the compilation album 55578, comprising many tracks previously featured on singles, as well as some unreleased material. The first 55,578 copies were special editions that contained a bonus disk with material recorded at the Strange Ways Festival. The album remained in the German charts for five weeks. The 1996 album Dreaming Apes reached number 91. Following its release, Wolfsheim embarked on their first tour in May 1996. A live recording was released in October 1997 named Hamburg Rom Wolfsheim.

Throughout the band's existence, both members were involved with various side projects. Reinhardt started the bands Nefkom and Neustart, both of which released their albums on Strange Ways. Heppner collaborated with Joachim Witt in 1998 on the song "Die Flut", which reached No. 2 in the German Single Charts and garnered them a platinum record. His increased popularity also boosted Wolfsheim's success; their album Spectators, released in February 1999, was the first to reach the top-10 in Germany, at number two. Since 2001, the album was distributed in the United States by Metropolis Records. Spectators reached gold status in Germany in 2004. The singles released off this album, "Once in a Lifetime", "It's Hurting for the First Time" and "Künstliche Welten" were all successful. That summer, Wolfsheim played at many of the major German festivals, including the Bizarre Festival, Rock am Ring, and Rock im Park. They also played their first show outside of Germany, at Belgium's Eurorock Festival.

Since 1999 Reinhardt focused on Care Company, a band whose 2001 album In the Flow was released on Motor/Universal. Heppner featured on tracks by several other artists. He collaborated among others with the dance project Schiller on the songs, "Dream of You" and "Leben... I Feel You", which were a big success all over Europe. He also collaborated on "Glasgarten" with Goethes Erben and "Wir sind Wir" with trance/techno-DJ Paul van Dyk.

In anticipation of a forthcoming album, Wolfsheim released the live DVD Kompendium on 16 April 2002, containing a recording from the Spectators tour, an interview, and various music videos. In March 2003, the release of Casting Shadows instantly sent it to the top spot in the German album charts and reached platinum status. The single "Kein Zurück", released on 2 February was the band's first single to enter into the Media Control Charts top-10, debuting at number five and moving up to the fourth spot. It remained in the charts for 10 weeks and reached gold status. Greatest highlight in the band's career was receiving an ECHO in 2004 for Best Alternative Domestic Band. A sold-out tour through Germany was followed by Wolfsheim's only tour through the US in March and April 2004.

== Discography ==
Albums

- 1992: No Happy View
- 1993: Popkiller
- 1995: 55578
- 1996: Dreaming Apes
- 1999: Spectators
- 2003: Casting Shadows

Live albums

- 1997: Hamburg Rom Wolfsheim

Demos

- 1988: Ken Manage
- 1989: Any But Pretty

Singles

- 1991: "The Sparrows and The Nightingales"
- 1992: "It's Not Too Late (Don't Sorrow)"
- 1992: "Thunderheart"
- 1993: "Now I Fall"
- 1994: "Elias"
- 1995: "Closer Still"
- 1996: "A New Starsystem Has Been Explored"
- 1998: "Once in a Lifetime"
- 1998: "It's Hurting for the First Time"
- 1999: "Künstliche Welten"
- 1999: "Sleep Somehow" (vinyl only)
- 2003: "Kein Zurück"
- 2003: "Find You're Gone"
- 2004: "Blind 2004"

DVDs

- 2002: Kompendium

== Awards ==
- ECHO 2004: Best German Alternative Band
