= Slide projector =

Opto-mechanical device for showing photographic slides

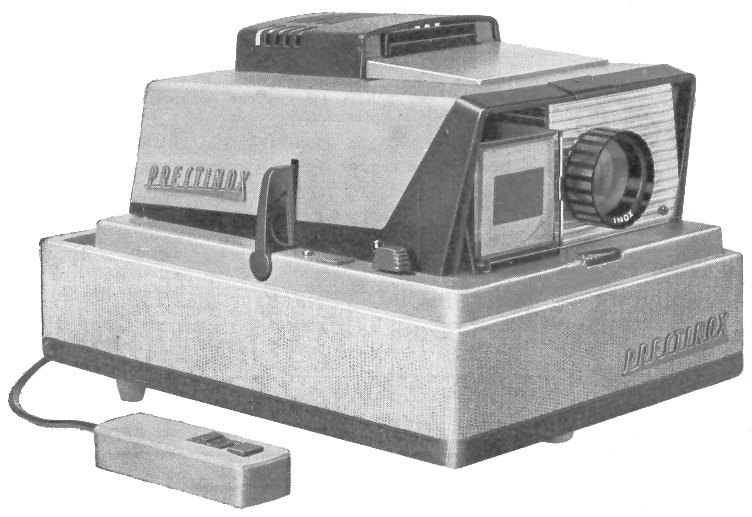
A 1960 slide projector

A slide projector is an optical device for projecting enlarged images of photographic slides onto a screen. Many projectors have mechanical arrangements to show a series of slides loaded into a special tray sequentially.

35 mm slide projectors, direct descendants of the larger-format magic lantern, first came into widespread use during the 1950s for slide shows as home entertainment, and for use by educational and other institutes. Reversal film created a small positive projectable image rather than the negatives used since the early days of photography; photography now produced 35mm directly viewable small colour slides, rather than large monochrome negatives. The slide images were too small for unaided viewing, and required enlargement by a projector or enlarging viewer.

Photographic film slides and projectors have been replaced by image files on digital storage media shown on a projection screen by using a video projector, or displayed on a large-screen video monitor.

== History ==
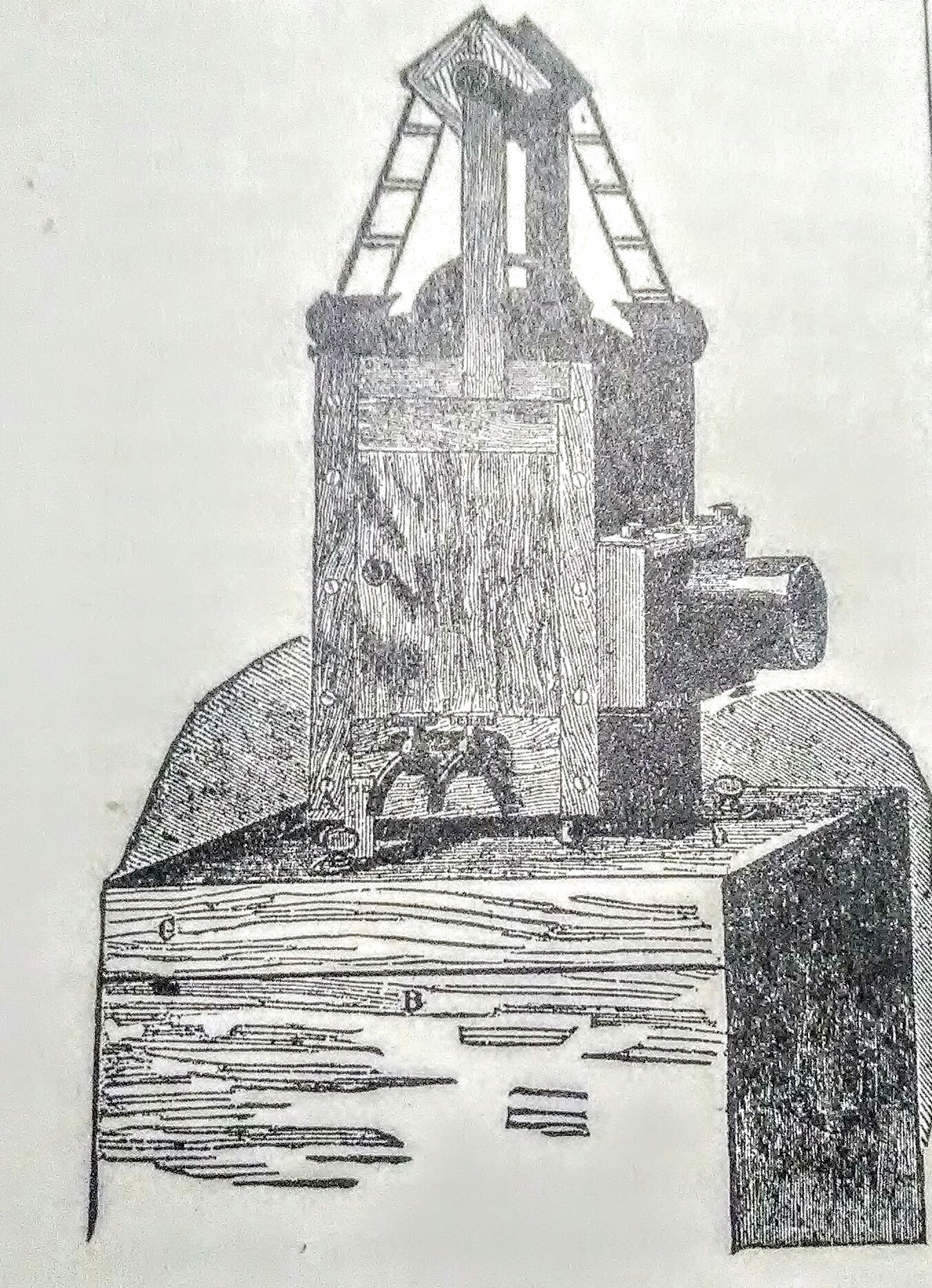
Continuous-Slide Lantern, c. 1881

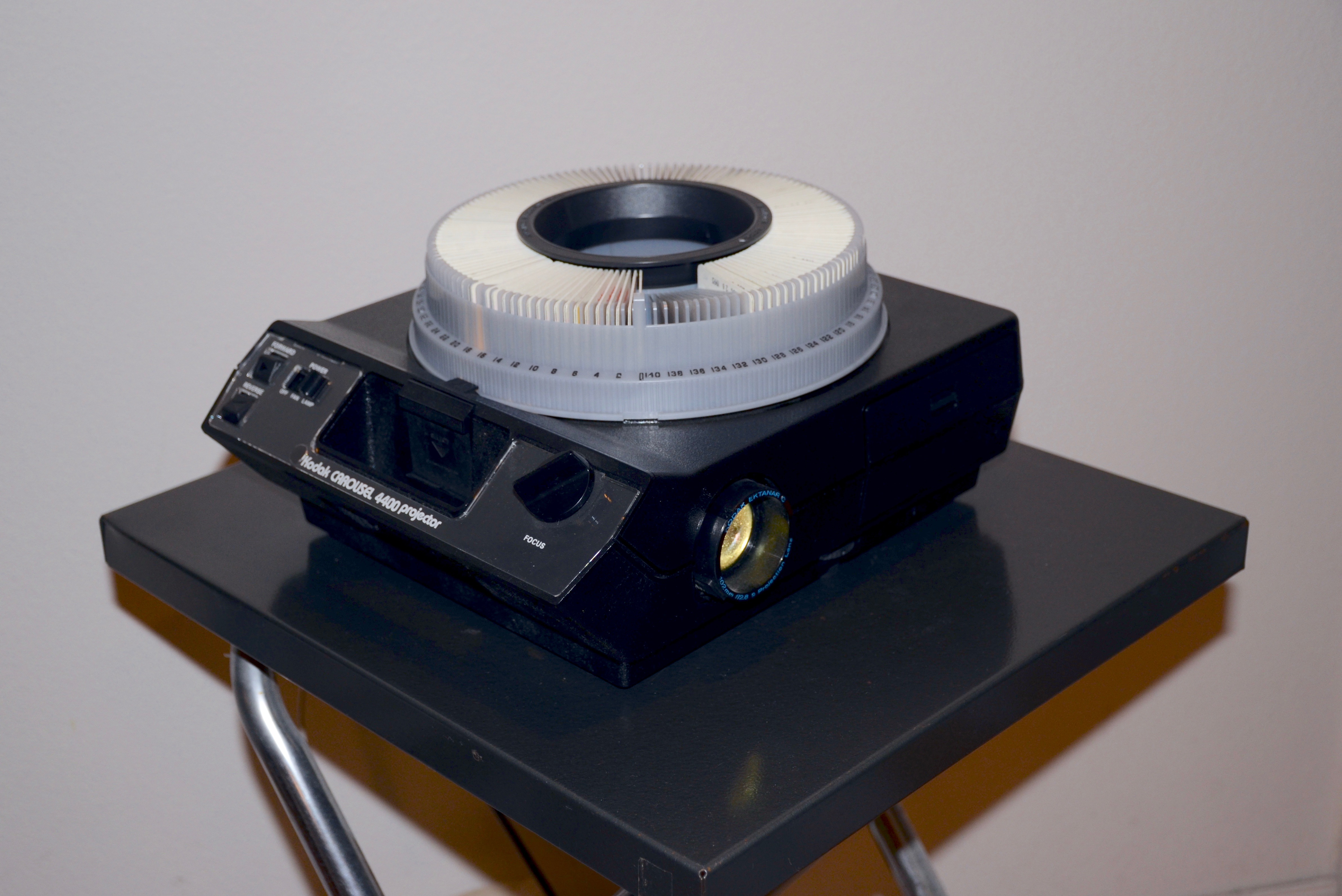
A Kodak Carousel model 4400 slide projector, first sold in the mid-1980s

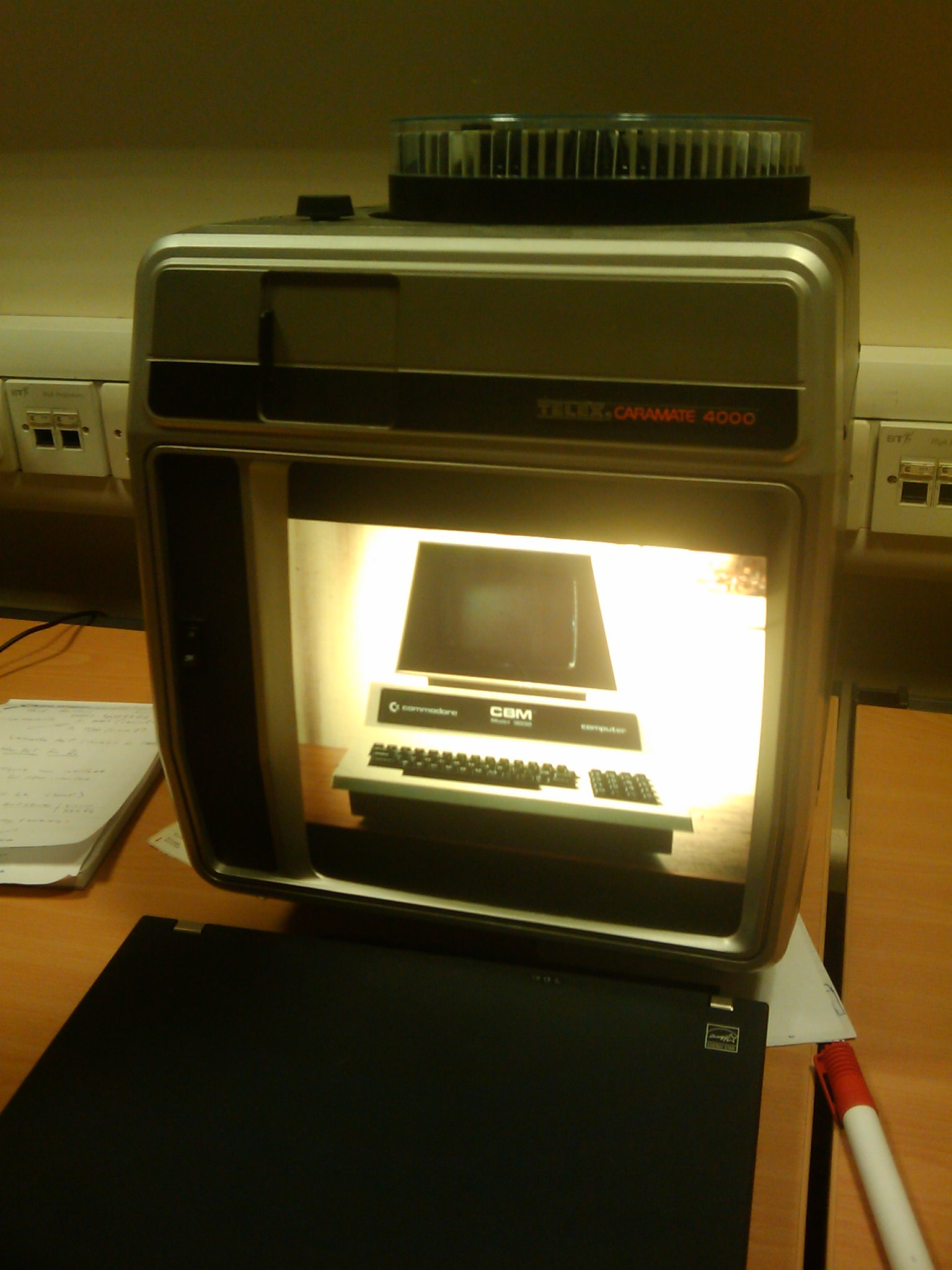
Self-contained slide projector with rear-projection screen and carousel tray

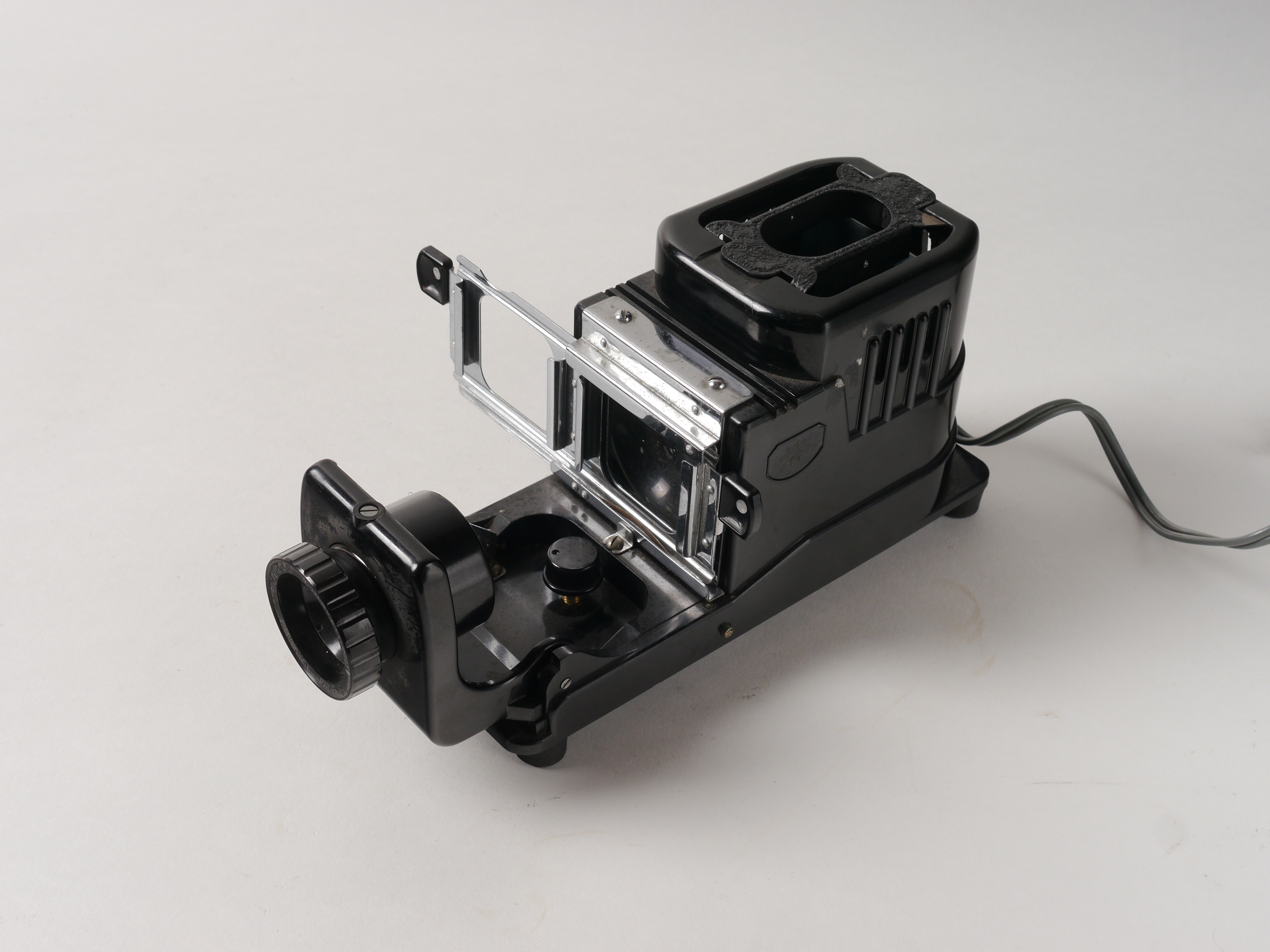
Slide projector in bakelite with holder for two slides that can be slid horizontally back and forth, brand Romanslide. 1960–1965. Collection Museum of Industry Ghent.

A continuous-slide lantern was patented in 1881. It included a dissolving views apparatus.

== Design ==
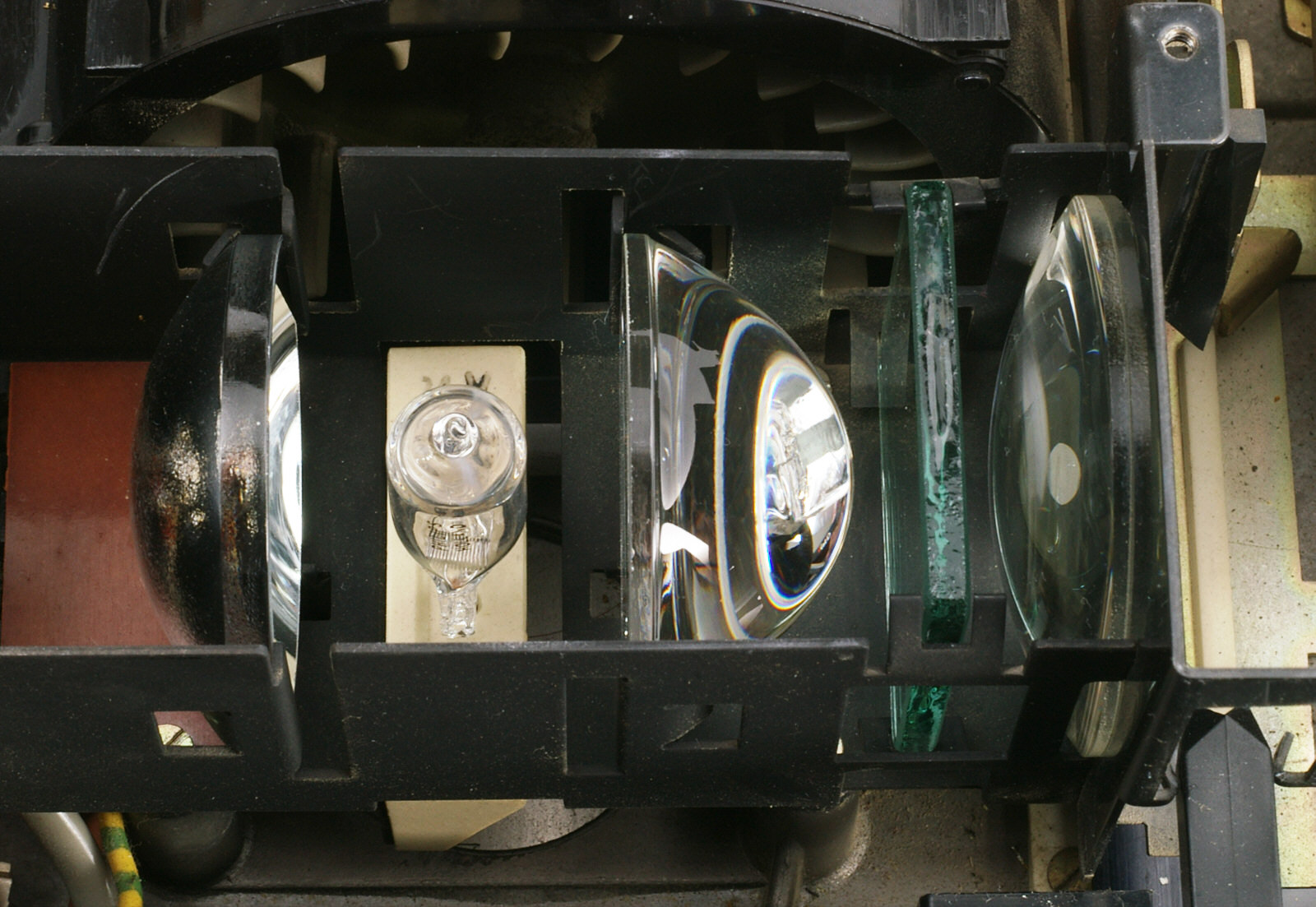
Slide projector light generation and condensing system: from left to right, mirror / reflector, bulb, condenser lens 1 (collector lens), green-tinted heat-absorbing glass, condenser lens 2; a centrifugal fan, used to cool the bulb, is visible at the top of the picture.

A projector has three main optical elements:

- high luminous flux electric incandescent light bulb or other light source, usually fan-cooled
- reflector and condenser lens system to direct the light through the slide
- focusing projection lens

Most slide projectors have a mechanism to hold slides in place during projection; many feature automated or mechanized slide advance and return to facilitate slideshows with multiple images.

=== Light source and condenser ===
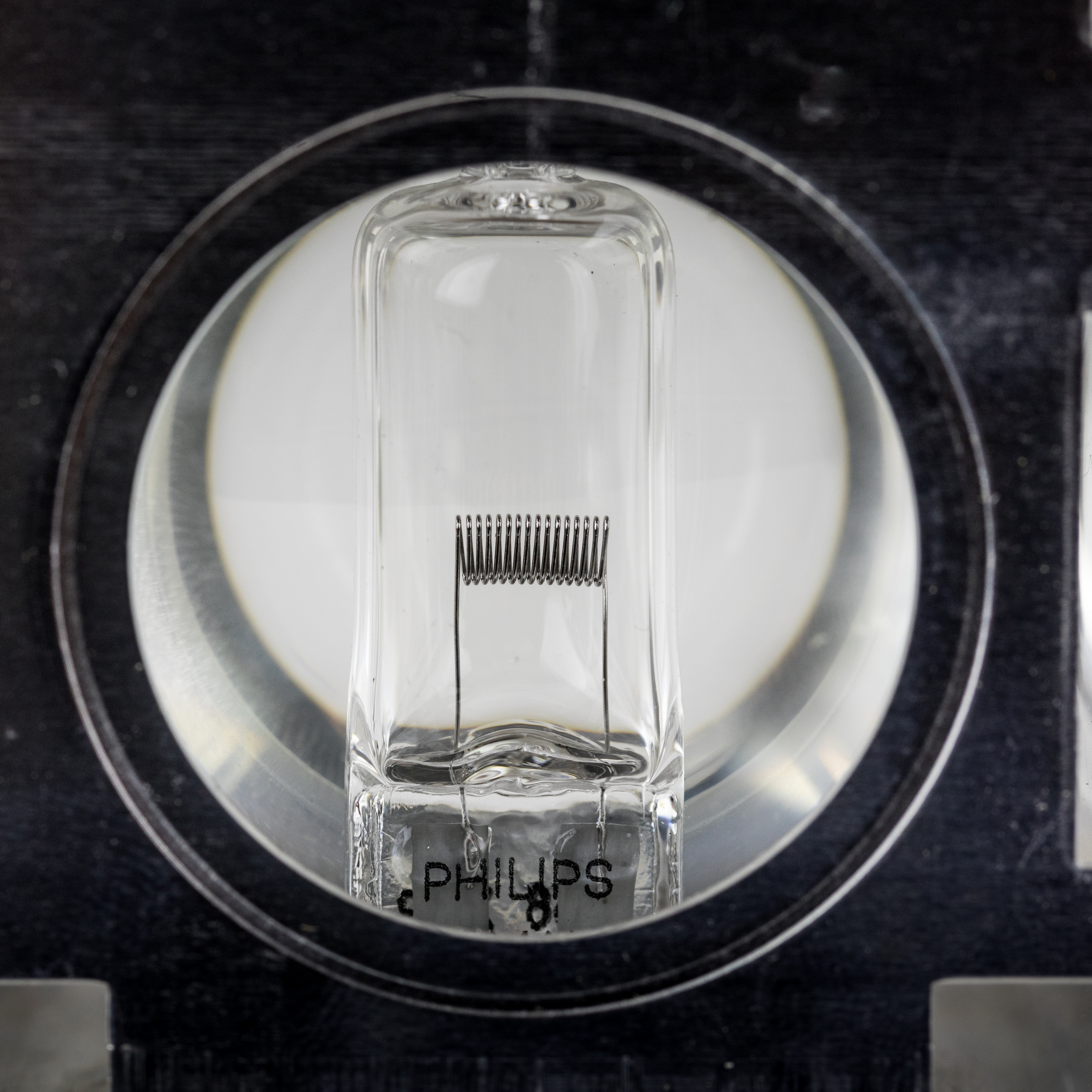
Philips halogen lamp used in Carl Braun Camera-Werk Novamat M 330 slide projector

A halogen lamp bulb is commonly used to generate light, usually specially designed to have a small, bright filament to produce a sharp, bright and uniform image. For example, the Leitz Pradovit RC uses a special 24V 150W quartz lamp, with provision to center it, required for best performance. This projector also had provision to reduce lamp power by 20% to double its life (50 hours at full brightness).

Every point source of light on the lamp filament is doubled via the spherical reflector and then focused onto the plane of the entrance pupil of the projection lens, to provide even illumination when forming an image of the projected slide. A flat piece of heat-absorbing or heat-reflecting glass (also called "heat mirror") is usually placed in the light path before the slide to avoid damaging the slide with heat. This glass transmits visible wavelengths but absorbs or reflects infrared. Some slide projectors used bulbs that had an integral parabolic multifaceted reflector which may also serve the function of the collector lens. These bulbs were more costly than bare bulbs, but were more convenient to use as the reflector did not have to be adjusted after bulb changes.

=== Projection ===
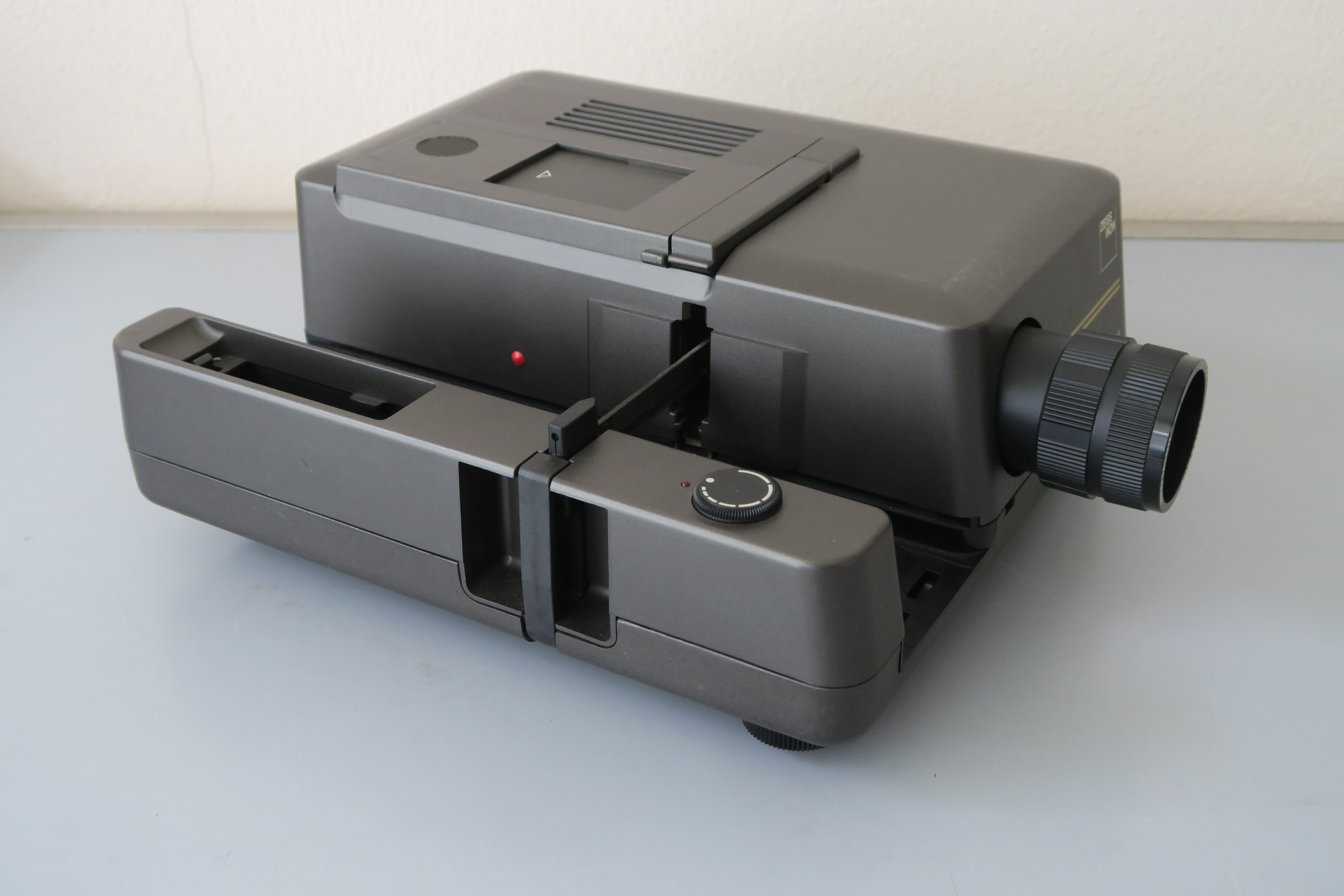
This slide projector, sold under the Zeiss Ikon brand, uses a straight-through tray; a thin arm grabs slides from a tray and puts them into the light path; the tray is advanced along its length. At the front of the projector, the protruding projection lens features rings to control focal length and focus.

After the condensed beam passes through the transparent slide, it is enlarged by a projection lens onto a flat projection screen so the audience can view the reflected image. For some slide projectors, the projection lens is removable and may be swapped with alternative lens(es) to change the brightness or focal length(s), which may affect potential size of the image or the distance from the screen required for a certain projected image size, respectively.

Standard focal lengths for projector lenses are approximately twice that of a normal lens for that film format, which allows the projector to be located behind the audience for an average screen size. For example, with 135 film, a standard projector lens focal length would be around 100 mm. Starting in the 1970s, some slide projectors were offered with autofocus to compensate for differences in slide mount thickness or warping.

Alternatively, the image may be projected onto a translucent "rear projection" screen, often used for continuous automatic display for close viewing. For example, the Singer Caramate and Bell & Howell RingMaster projected slides onto a flat screen approximately the size and shape of a small CRT TV; the RingMaster also could be used for front projection for larger audiences. This form of projection also avoids the potential of the audience interrupting the projected light beam by casting their shadows on the projection or by bumping into the projector.

=== Mechanical ===
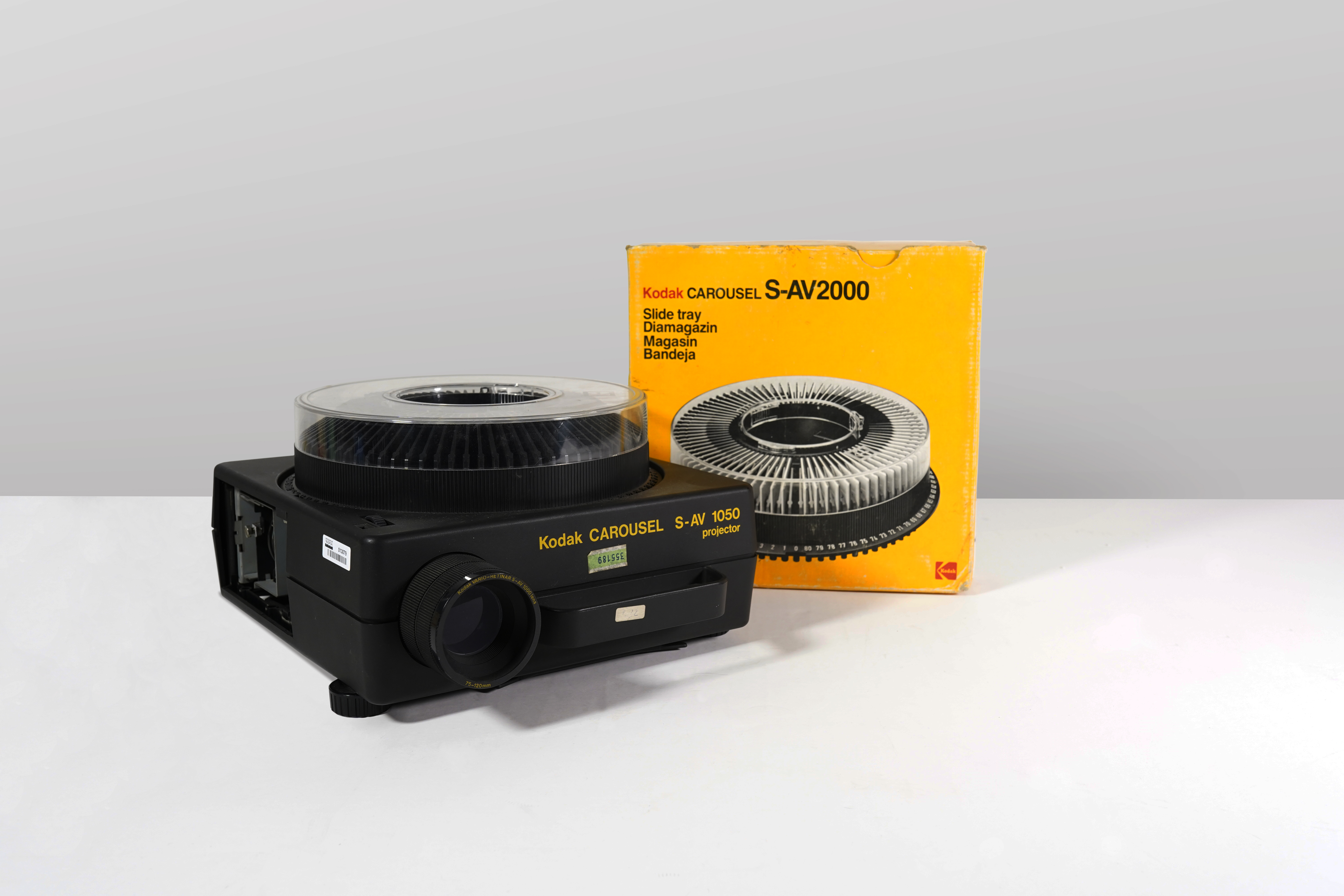
Kodak Carousel S-AV 1050, which features a horizontal rotary slide tray

Some slide projectors required users to manually place each slide that was being shown. Starting in the 1950s, manufacturers introduced slide projectors with mechanisms which handle slides preloaded into cartridges, moving individual slides into and out of the light path in sequence. One of the primary differentiators between slide projectors was the form factor of the cartridges used to hold and, in many cases, store slides. Some automated slide projectors offered slide trays with straight, rectangular shapes, which were popular in Europe; these use an arm, moving laterally, to extract a slide from the cartridge for projection. Some straight-tray machines could also accept vertical rotary cartridges, which resemble a Ferris wheel. In the United States, Eastman Kodak introduced Carousel slide projectors in 1961, which used a horizontal rotary cartridge like the namesake merry-go-round, and the format soon became ubiquitous there. Advantages of Carousel-type slide projectors include a simpler, gravity-fed mechanism, and the ability to automatically repeat the sequence of images without having to reload; however, the circular trays tended to be bulkier and more expensive.

Sophisticated transition effects between images, such as dissolves, can be performed with multiple projectors; Rollei introduced the P3800 at photokina 1976, which had two lenses and could perform without an additional unit. By 1990, Rollei marketed the Rolleivision 35 Twin Digital, an upgraded P3800 which added a personal computer interface to control its operation. However, competing technologies which used images directly displayed from computers, such as projection panels and video projectors, largely displaced film slide projectors by the mid-1990s.

== Types ==
Slide projectors proper:

- Straight-tray slide projectors have a straight magazine holding several slides.
- Carousel slide projectors have a circular magazine holding several slides.
- Stack-loader slide projectors
- Bell & Howell Slide Cube Projector had a cube-shaped magazine holding several slides.
- Dual slide projectors
- Single slide projectors project a single slide at a time, changed by the operator.
- Dissolve projectors
- Stereo slide projectors project two slides simultaneously with different polarizations, making slides appear as three-dimensional to viewers wearing polarizing glasses
- Medium-format slide projectors, for medium-format slides larger than 35mm.
- Specialised large-format slide projectors for large transparencies of 18 × 18 cm (7.1 × 7.1") or larger.

Related devices:

- Overhead projectors, for page-sized transparencies
- Slide viewer, for direct viewing of a magnified image of a slide

== Manufacturers ==
List of known manufacturers of slide projectors:

- Agfa Gevaert, Germany (−1984) → Reflecta (1984–)
- Bauer, Germany → Bosch; ceased production
- Bausch & Lomb; ceased production
- Bell & Howell / TDC, US: "Headliner"; ceased production
- Braun AG, Germany: "D", "PA"; ceased production
- Braun Foto Technik, Germany: "Paximat", "Multimag" → Reflecta
- VEB DEFA, Germany: "Filius"→ VEB Gerätewerk Friedrichshagen: "Filius"; ceased production
- Eastman Kodak (−2004): "Carousel-S", "Ektagraphic", "Ektapro" → Leica
- Elmo, Japan
- Enna, Germany; ceased production
- Erno Photo, Germany; ceased production
- VEB Feinmess, Germany; ceased production
- Filmoli, Germany → Gebr. Martin, Germany; ceased production
- Foto Quelle, Germany: "Revue"; ceased distribution
- GAF, US; ceased distribution
- Götschmann, Germany (1978–2009) → Gecko-Cam (2009–)
- Hanimex, Australia; ceased production
- Hasselblad, Sweden; ceased production
- HASPE, Germany; ceased production
- Hähnel, Germany; ceased production
- Inox, France: "Prestige" → Prestinox
- Kindermann, Germany: "Diafocus" → Leica
- Leitz, Germany (1958–): "Prado" → Leica Projektion GmbH Zett Gerätewerk, Germany (1990–2004): "Pradovit", "Pradovit RT" → Leica Camera, Germany (2004–2006): "Pradovit"; ceased production
- Liesegang, Germany: "Fantax", "Diafant", "Fantimat"; ceased production
- Malinski, Germany: "Prokyon", "Malicolor" → Pentacon
- Minolta, Japan; ceased production
- Minox, Germany: "Minomat"; ceased production
- Navitar, US
- Nikon, Japan; ceased production
- Ernst Plank, Germany: "Noris", "Trumpf"; ceased production
- Pentacon, Germany: "Aspectar", "Malicolor"; ceased production
- Asahi Pentax, Japan; ceased production
- Prestinox, France → Plawa Condor (1969–?); ceased production
- Pouva, Germany; ceased production
- RBT, Germany
- Queen, Germany: "Automat"; ceased distribution
- Reflecta, Germany: "Multimag"
- Rollei, Germany (1960–2007): "Rolleiscop", "Rolleivision" → Franke & Heidecke, Germany (2007–2009): "Rolleivision" → DHW Fototechnik, Germany (2009–2015): "Rolleivision"; ceased production
- Royal, Germany?; ceased distribution
- Sankyo, Japan; ceased production
- Sawyer's, US; company sold to GAF
- Silma, Italy → Bauer and Rollei; ceased production
- TAV Simda
- Tower (house brand of Sears, Roebuck and Co.)
- Vicom
- Vivitar, US
- Voigtländer, Germany: "Perkeo" → Zett
- Zeiss Ikon, Germany (1964/1969–): "Ikolux" → Zett
- Zeiss Jena, Germany → Pentacon, Germany
- Zett, Germany (1928–1989): "Fafix", "Zett", "Zettomat", "Perkeo" → Leica Projektion GmbH Zett Gerätewerk, Germany (1990–2004)
- CBИTЯ3ъ, Russia: "ABTO"; ceased production

== See also ==
- Slide viewer
- Carousel slide projector
- Presentation slide

== Bibliography ==
- Murphy, Burt (February 1973). Slide projectors get smarter all the time. Popular Mechanics.
