= Strange Ways =

German record label

Strange Ways Records
- Founded: 1989
- Distributor(s): Indigo (Europe); Metropolis Records (US)
- Genre: Various
- Country of origin: Germany
- Location: Hamburg, Germany
- Official website: http://www.strangeways.de

Strange Ways Records is an independent record label from Hamburg, Germany.

== Signed artists ==
- Delaware
- Wolfsheim

== See also ==
- List of record labels
