= Firmness, commodity, and delight =

3 principles of good architecture

Firmness, commodity, and delight (Latin: firmitas, utilitas et venustas) are the three aspects of good architecture declared by the Roman architect Vitruvius in his book "De architectura" ("On architecture", 1st century BC) and also known as Vitruvian virtues, Vitruvian Triad. The literal meaning of the Latin phrase is closer to "durability, convenience, and beauty", but the more familiar version is derived from Henry Wotton's liberal translation of Vitruvius, "The Elements of Architecture" (1624): "Well Building hath three Conditions; Commodity, Firmness, and Delight". An equivalent in modern English would be:

- Durability – a building should stand up robustly and remain in good condition
- Utility – it should be suitable for the purposes for which it is used
- Beauty – it should be aesthetically pleasing

According to Vitruvius, the architect should strive to fulfill each of these three attributes as well as possible.

The theory of architecture has always been concerned with this interrelated triad of structural integrity, proper use of space, and attractiveness. However, the relative importance of each component varied in time, and new elements had been introduced into the mix from time to time (cf. John Ruskin's "The Seven Lamps of Architecture" that include "sacrifice" and "obedience").

== Evolution ==
The order of words chosen by Vitruvius, with structural integrity coming before the utility, can be explained in two ways. Either the emphasis on firmness was driven by an understanding of architecture as an "art of building", or by the fact that buildings frequently outlive their initial purpose, so "functions, customs, ... and fashions ... are only transitory" (Auguste Perret), and architecture's true impression is in the construction.

While popular again nowadays, the original order of words was modified in 15th century by Leon Battista Alberti who moved the commodity to the first place in the triad. This order was repeated in the 16th century by Andrea Palladio in his "I quattro libri dell'architettura" (Italian: l’utile o comodità, la perpetuità, e la bellezza) which was apparently the source for Wotton's translation.

19th century brought the new materials and construction techniques that allowed architectural forms to be built seemingly defying the laws of gravity, and societal changes that forced a rethinking of proper spatial arrangements. This gave an additional momentum to the idea, first expressed in the late 18th century by Jacques-François Blondel, that beauty ("decoration") is the only worthy aspect of the architectural theory, while the space planning and structural analysis should be left to practitioners (and later, to other disciplines). These considerations had affected teaching of the architectural theory for a long time, but they eventually went out of fashion, and, since the 1960s, the education of architects returned to the synthesis of structural, spatial, and perceptual elements (postmodernism as envisioned by Robert Venturi) or architectural phenomenology of Christian Norberg-Schulz.

== Venustas ==
Latin: venustas (lit. "of goddess Venus") carries strong association with the erotic love, so Alberti changed it to Latin: amoenitas ("pleasure") in the 15th century. He also split the beauty into essential Latin: pulchritudo, the beauty of proportions, and superficial Latin: ornamentum that only goes skin-deep ("auxiliary brightness"). Much later Le Corbusier held the view that beauty in architecture stems essentially from good mathematical proportions. The distinction between the two sides of beauty was watered down in the early 20th century when ornament started to be thought of as an integral part of the building; both were completely fused together by Bauhaus with its explicit "goal, ... the great building, in which the old dividing-line between monumental and decorative elements would have disappeared for ever" (Walter Gropius, 1935).

After introduction of aesthetics in the 18th century, the emotional impact of the buildings was thought to include not just the beauty, but sublimity, picturesqueness, even ugliness. The latter, for example, was proposed to express in architecture the virtue of manliness.

== Utilitas ==
The purpose of buildings is to provide space for some functions, so the notion of the utility ("commodity") is the least controversial of the triad. The architectural form is influenced by the building's purpose, so frequently "form follows function". However, in many cases it is impossible to predict that proper spatial allocation for the future function and, in the real world, the buildings are often more durable than the need for their original function. When repurposing the building for, say, a social institution, the structure of that institution not infrequently is influenced by the layout of the building, a case of "function follows form". For example, the system of seating used in the UK House of Commons (government and opposition facing each other) has roots in the constraints of its original location, St Stephen's Chapel. French Legislative Assembly was originally seated in the Théâtre des Tuileries with audience addressed by orators. None of the two buildings was built for the democratic debates, instead, they had differently affected the legislative processes in the two countries.

== Firmitas ==
The primacy of structural integrity ("firmness") declared by Vitruvius came under scrutiny in the 20th century. Some theorists are arguing that due to rapid obsolescence of the modern building, the architects should design temporary structures that are easy to demolish after a few years of use. Since the economic efficiency of such construction is unknown, many practitioners follow Vitruvius and believe in permanency of buildings.

The subject of interplay between the external beauty of the building and its structural system is also a subject of debate. Since the Classic antiquity and until 18th century, the question on whether it is better to provide visual clues to the structural elements underlying an architectural form ("emphasize the structure") or "hide the structure" was considered unimportant, although Alberti in the 15th century recommended the building exterior to reflect the trabeated system regardless of the actual structural elements used. In general, in Italy the construction practice frequently involved building the structure with bricks and then covering it in marble or plaster for appearance, and the architects accepted the independence of the structure and appearance of the forms. In French Île-de-France, with its abundance of high-quality stone that did not need covering, the architectural theory suggested that the structural elements should stay visible. The architects were still expected to manifest the structural integrity of the building in its exterior, creating "apparent stability".

Gothic Revival architecture in the middle of 19th century upended this agreement and stated that flying buttress with its exposed structure is a much better expression of firmitas than the westwork that hides its structural role behind the bulky appearance. The Revivalist architects also declared the need for "truthfulness" in the buildings, both in the use of materials (foreboding the "truth to materials") and the use of structural elements. This new doctrine stimulated the rapid changes in architectural forms in the 20th century, when rapid progress in structural materials (like steel frame) made old architecture forms unusable.

== Triad as a slogan ==
ewo

Firmness, commodity, and delight is one of the "great slogans" of architecture, along with form follows function, truth to materials, less is more, emphasize the structure. The triad is listed on the reverse side of the Pritzker Architecture Prize medal.

== See also ==
- Ten Principles for Good design

== Sources ==
- Roger Scruton, Peter Collins, “Commodity, firmness, and delight”: the ultimate synthesis at the Encyclopædia Britannica
- Gelernter, Mark (1995). Sources of Architectural Form: A Critical History of Western Design Theory. Manchester University Press. ISBN 978-0-7190-4129-7.
- "Architecture". The Encyclopaedia Britannica, Or Dictionary of Arts, Sciences, and General Literature: Ana - Ast. Black. 1853.
- Banham, Reyner (1965). "A home is not a house" (PDF). Art in America. 2 (4).
