= S.E.H Kelly =

London-based company

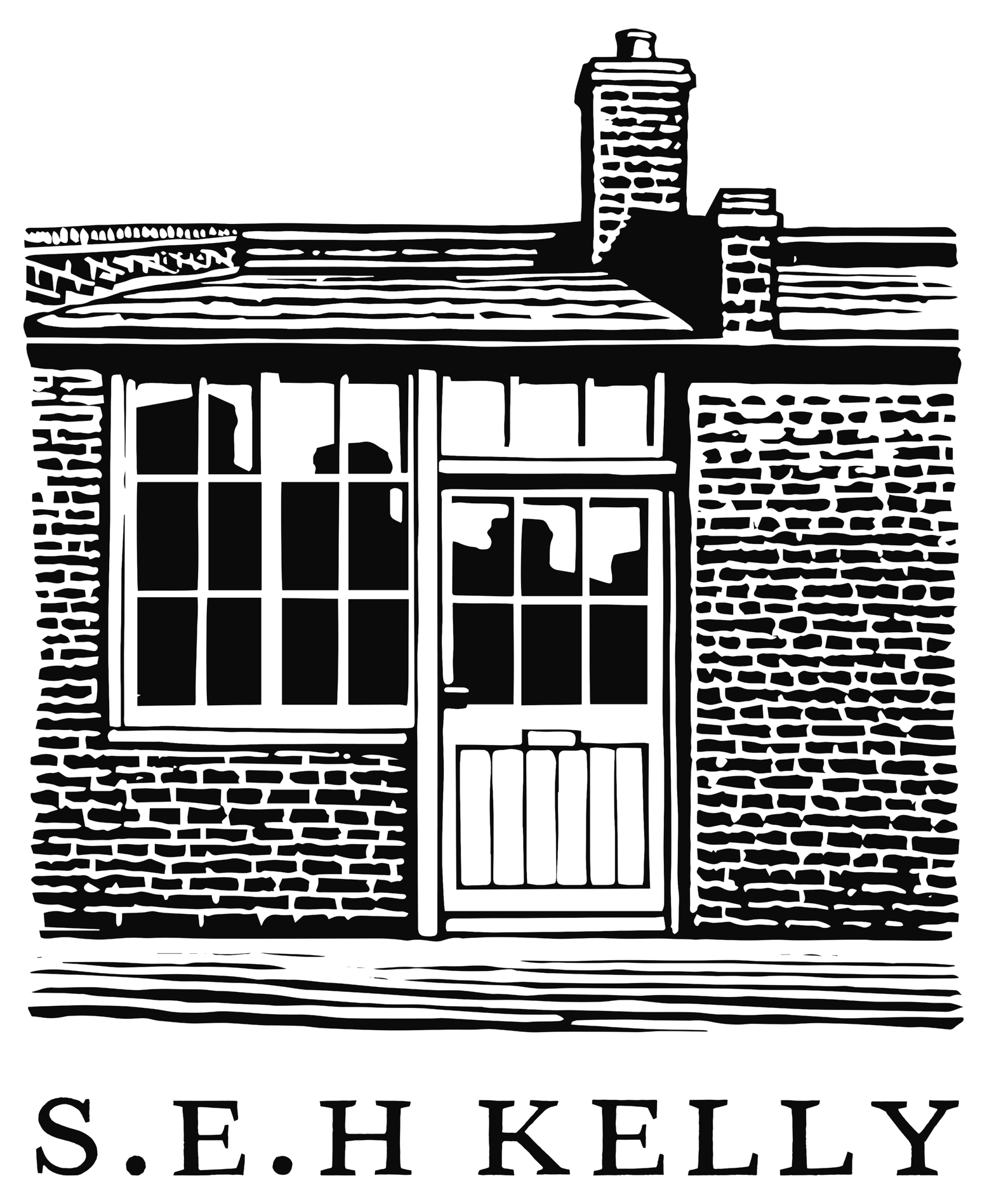
- Industry: Fashion
- Founded: 2009
- Founder: Paul Vincent; Sara Kelly
- Headquarters: Shoreditch; London, E2; United Kingdom
- Products: Apparel
- Website: www.sehkelly.com

S.E.H Kelly is a clothing company based in Shoreditch, London with mills and factories in the United Kingdom.

== Background ==
S.E.H Kelly was founded in 2009 by Sara Kelly and Paul Vincent. Sara Kelly is the design half of the duo and studied at London College of Fashion from 2000 to 2004. Upon graduating in 2004, Kelly worked for Savile Row tailoring and couture house Hardy Amies, and founded S.E.H Kelly with Paul Vincent, whose background included menswear retail and advertising, in 2009.

== Workshop ==
S.E.H Kelly is based in Cleeve Workshops on Boundary Street in Shoreditch in the London Borough of Hackney. The workshop is Grade II-listed and is part of the Boundary Street Estate. English Heritage records indicate it was built in 1895 and was designed by Reginald Minton Taylor

== Events ==
In late October 2014, S.E.H. Kelly temporarily set up its studio at the west London shop of Vitsoe's for an exhibition entitled An Unassuming Wardrobe. The exhibition ran for ten days, from 24 October to 1 November.
