= Utilitarian design =

Design philosophy

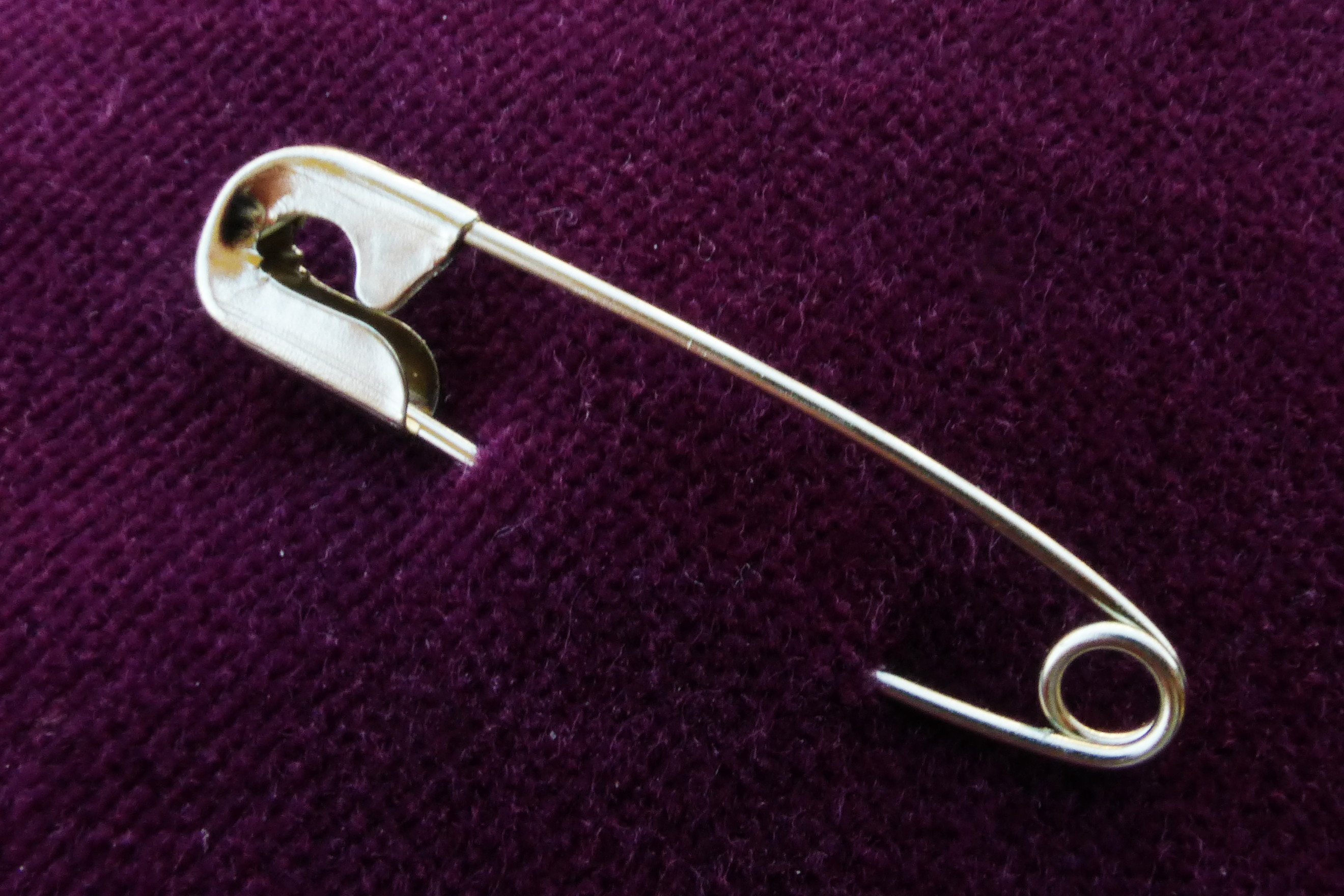
The utilitarian design of a safety pin changed little since its invention in 1849 and over time acquired multiple symbolic meanings, including the rejection of mainstream beauty.

Utilitarian design is an art concept that argues for the products to be designed based on the utility (as opposed to the "contemplated pleasure" of beauty). For example, an object intended for a narrow and practical purpose does not need to be aesthetically pleasing, but it must be effective for its task and inexpensive: a steel power pylon carries electric wires just as well as a marble column would, and at a much lower cost. The idea of utilitarian design is rooted in the philosophical utilitarianism, "the greatest good for the greatest number [of people]".

While an artefact designed with complete disregard of appearance (purely or strictly utilitarian design) can be imagined, David Pye argues that such objects do not exist, as human nature makes it impossible to design anything without even a slightest consideration of its appearance. As far back as in the Paleolithic Age, the stone tools were sometimes manufactured with better quality than the one required for the task. According to Pye, in practice the "purely utilitarian" objects are the ones made to fit the purpose at the lowest possible cost, from scaffolding to an oil refinery. In many cases making things more pleasing to the eye incurs no extra cost, and the techniques that result in better appearance are chosen in these cases. For example, the proper application of plaster to brick walls fulfills both functional (stopping the drafts) and aesthetic (smooth surface) goals.

There is no clear boundary between the result of the utilitarian design and an object of art, with a classic example provided by cars. An automobile is simultaneously a very utilitarian mean of transportation and a highly personalized extension of ego. Since the innovations in the utility and appearance are covered by two different mechanisms of intellectual property protection (patents for functionality, copyrights and trademarks for aesthetics), issues of the utilitarian design are of great interest to the courts and legal scholars.

The concept of utilitarian design is strongly associated with the Bauhaus school that championed it in the early 20th century.

== Functionalism ==
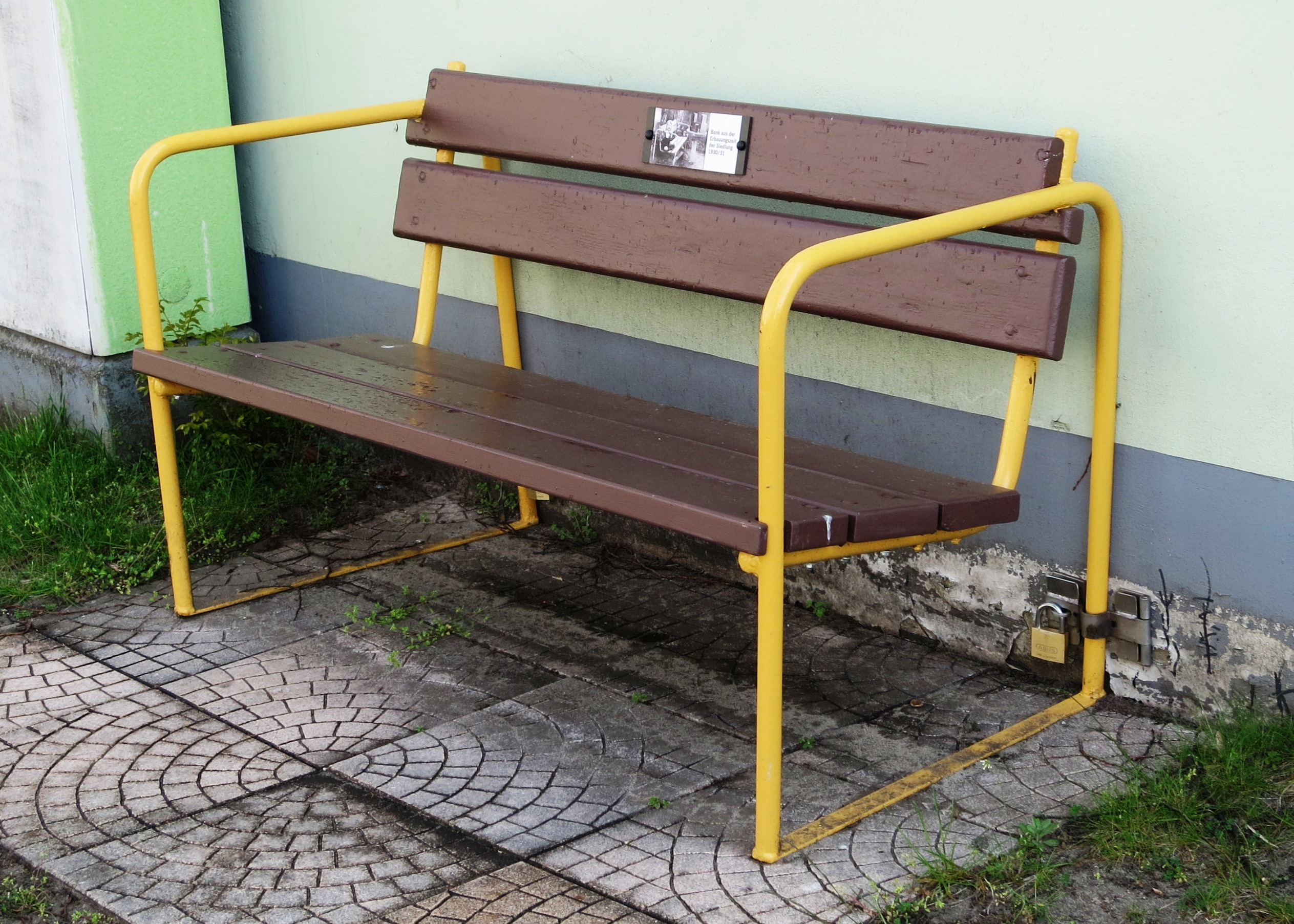
Bench of the Bauhaus era

The rise of modernism in the late 19th and early 20th century caused utilitarian design, based on utility and economy, to be declared beautiful through a new aesthetic doctrine, functionalism. The initial stance of functionalists was uncompromising: a design using extravagant materials or ornamental elements cannot be beautiful; Adolf Loos titled his 1908 essay "Ornament and Crime". While this idealistic position softened with time, the "form follows function" idea remains highly influential, especially in architecture.

Charles and Ray Eames stated that, when it comes to furniture, utility is more durable than appearance: "what works good is better than what looks good, the looks good can change, but what works, works". The functionalism of furniture is pervasive since the advent of the International Style and especially noticeable in Scandinavian Modern.

== Utility and copyright ==
=== United States ===
In the United States, the "utilitarian article" (defined by 17 U.S.C. § 101 as an article of manufacture with an "intrinsic utilitarian function") may, in addition to patents, be protected by copyright per Copyright Act of 1976 if it possesses pictorial, graphic, or sculptural (PGS) features. For the copyright laws to apply to the PGS features, it should be possible to separate them from the pure utilitarian design. The US courts hold the position that trademark protection is only possible for features that are not "functional" and therefore "dispensable", like an identifying name. Granting trademark protection for functional features, "essential to the use or purpose of the article" or "[affecting] the cost or quality of the article" would effectively grant a patent of unlimited duration and thus create a monopoly. This antitrust stand, a so-called "functionality doctrine", is especially pronounced since 1995 (US Supreme Court decision in Qualitex Co. v. Jacobson Products Co.).

=== European Union ===
In the European Union, the legal treatment of the designs was harmonized in 1998 via the Directive on the legal protection of designs 98/71/EC. Similarly to the US, details of appearance that are dictated by the utility are excluded from copyright protection.

== See also ==
- Machine aesthetic
- Minimalism, an art movement
- Less is more, an artistic principle
- Industrial design

== Sources ==
- Ángel-Bravo, Rafael (2020-12-16). "The Banana Leaf Approach: An Appreciation of Utilitarian Handcrafted Artifacts in the American Context". Sociedad y Economía. doi:10.25100/sye.v0i42.10248. hdl:10893/20124. ISSN 2389-9050.
- Benda, Camille (2021). Dressing the Resistance: The Visual Language of Protest. Princeton Architectural Press. ISBN 978-1-64896-084-0.
- Boyce, C. (1985). Dictionary of Furniture. Skyhorse.
- Cunningham, M. A. (1996). "Utilitarian Design Features and Antitrust Parallels: An Economic Approach to Understanding the Funtionality Defense in Trademark Litigation". Hastings Communications and Entertainment Law Journal. 18 (3): 572–589.
- Ginsburg, Jane C. (2016). "Courts Have Twisted Themselves into Knots: US Copyright Protection for Applied Art". Columbia Journal of Law and Arts. 40 (1).
- Heskett, J. (2005). Design: A Very Short Introduction. Very Short Introductions. OUP Oxford. ISBN 978-0-19-160661-8.
- Lynch, Michael J. (1991). "Copyright in Utilitarian Objects: Beneath Metaphysics". University of Dayton Law Review. 16 (3): 647–677.
- Mahmood, Tiffany (2015). "Design Law in the United States as Compared to the European Community Design System: What Do We Need to Fix?". Fordham Intellectual Property, Media and Entertainment Law Journal. 24 (2): 555–583.
- Pye, David (1978). The Nature and Aesthetics of Design. London: Random House Business Books. ISBN 978-0-214-20375-6.
- Setliff, Eric (2006). "Copyright and Industrial Design: An Alternative Design Alternative". Columbia Journal of Law & the Arts. 30 (1): 49–78.
- Sites, Cole (January 22, 2025). "Utilitarian Design "Aesthetic"". American Society of Design and Drafting.
- Sturgis, Daniel (2019). Bauhaus: Utopia in Crisis. London: Camberwell College of Arts.
