= Dieter Rams =

German industrial designer

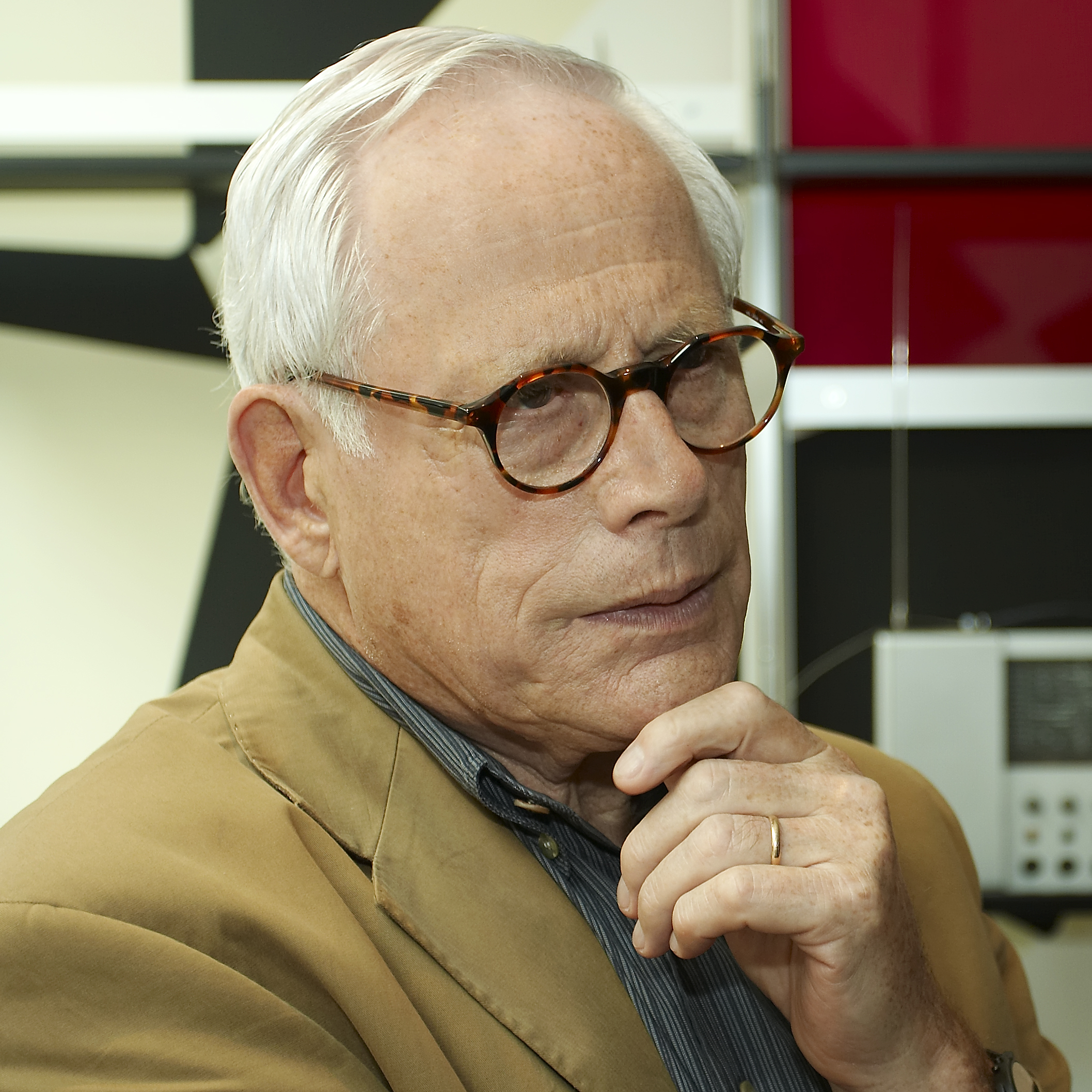
- Dieter Rams in 2010
- Born: 20 May 1932 (age 94); Wiesbaden, Hesse-Nassau, Prussia, Germany
- Occupation: Industrial designer
- Known for: Ten principles of "good design"; Braun consumer products; Vitsœ furniture
- Notable work: Braun SK 4 radiogram; Vitsœ 606 Universal Shelving System
- Spouse: Ingeborg Kracht-Rams
- Awards: Commander's Cross (German Order of Merit, 2002); Lifetime Achievement Medal (London Design Festival, 2013); Compasso d'Oro Career Award (ADI Milan, 2014)
- Website: rams-foundation.org

Dieter Rams (born 20 May 1932) is a German industrial designer who is most closely associated with the consumer products company Braun, the furniture company Vitsœ, and the functionalist school of industrial design. His unobtrusive approach and belief in "less, but better" (German: Weniger, aber besser) design has influenced the practice of design, as well as 20th century aesthetics and culture. He is quoted as stating that "Indifference towards people and the reality in which they live is actually the one and only cardinal sin in design."

== Early life and education ==
Dieter Rams was born in Wiesbaden, Germany, in 1932. He began his studies in architecture and interior decoration at Wiesbaden School of Art (now part of the RheinMain University of Applied Sciences) in 1947. A year later, he took a break from studying to gain practical experience and finish his carpentry apprenticeship. He returned to the Wiesbaden School of Art in 1948 and graduated in architecture with honours in 1953, after which he began working for Frankfurt-based architect Otto Apel. In 1955, at the age of 23, he was recruited by Braun as an architect and interior designer.

== Career ==
=== Braun ===
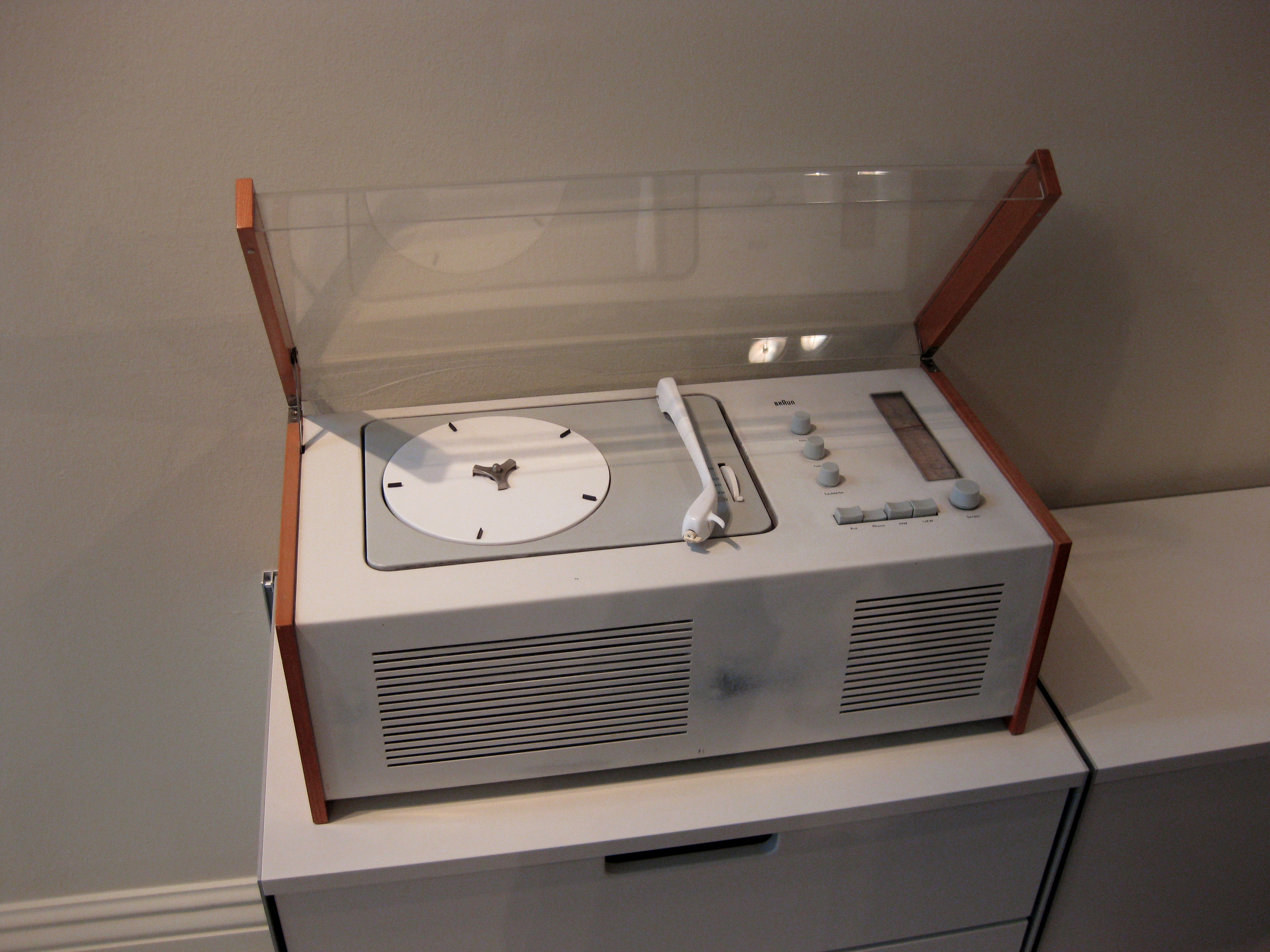
Braun Phonosuper SK 4 "Snow White's coffin" by Dieter Rams and Hans Gugelot (1956)

Rams joined Braun in 1955, and six years later he became head of design at the company, a position he retained until his retirement at the age of 65 in 1997.

After he joined the company, he became a protégé of Fritz Eichler and the Ulm School of Design professors Hans Gugelot and Otl Aicher, all of whom worked for Braun in various capacities. Speaking with Alessandro Mendini years later, Rams recalled this period at Braun as having been "marked by the Ulm school, through Hans Gugelot, in the sphere of product design and Otl Aicher in that of graphic design." He went on to say that "My own work and that of my group would have been unthinkable without the way paved by them."

Gugelot, Rams, and their colleagues designed many products for Braun including the Phonosuper SK 4 radiogram and the 'D'-series (D 45, D 46) of 35mm film slide projectors. The SK 4, known as the "Snow White's coffin," is considered revolutionary because it transitioned household appliance design away from looking like traditional furniture. By producing electronic gadgets that were remarkable in their austere aesthetic and user friendliness, Rams made Braun a household name in the 1950s.

In 1968, Rams designed the cylindric T2 cigarette lighter. A member of Braun's board had asked him for a design; Rams replied, "only if we design our own technology to go inside them." Successive versions of the product went on to use then-current motorcycle-like magnetic ignition, followed by piezoelectric, and finally solar-powered mechanisms.

=== Vitsœ ===
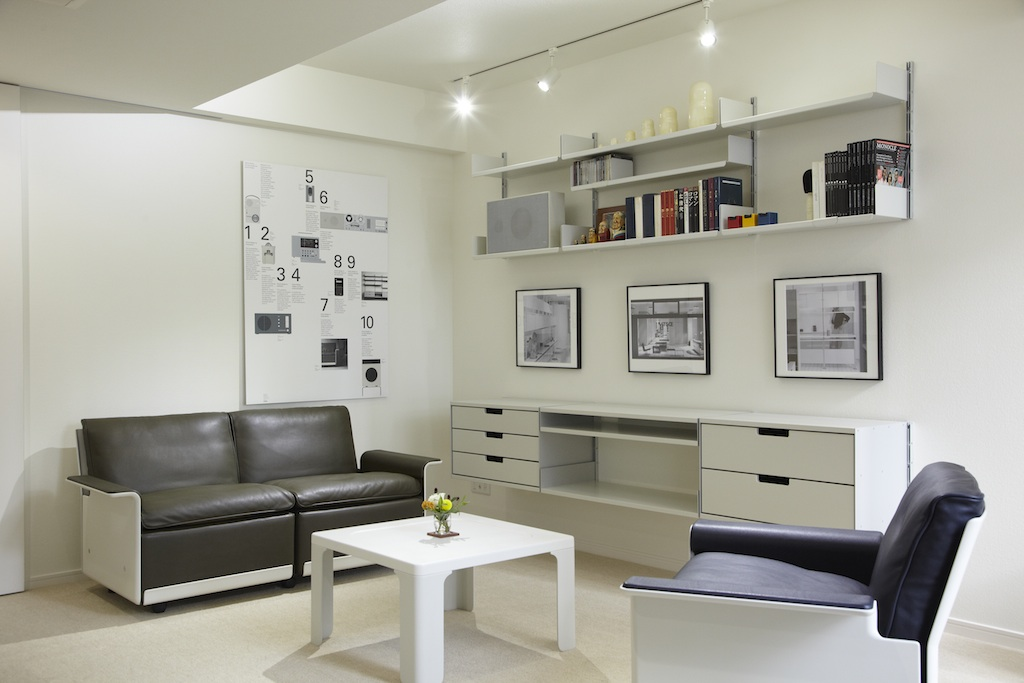
Rams's furniture seen in a Vitsœ showroom in Tokyo

In 1959, Rams began a collaboration with Vitsœ, at the time known as Vitsœ-Zapf, which led to the development of the 606 Universal Shelving System, which is still sold today, with only minor changes from the original. He also designed furniture for Vitsœ in the 1960s, including the 620 chair collection. He worked with both Braun and Vitsœ until his retirement in 1997, and continues to work with Vitsœ.

=== Influence ===
His approach to design and his aesthetics influenced Apple designer Jonathan Ive and many Apple products pay tribute to Rams's work for Braun, including Apple's iOS calculator, which references the 1987 ET66 calculator, and prior to a redesign, the appearance of the playing screen in Apple's Podcast app mimicked the appearance of the Braun TG 60 reel-to-reel tape recorder. The iOS 7 world clock app closely mirrors Braun's clock and watch design, while the original iPod closely resembles the Braun T3 transistor radio.

In Gary Hustwit's 2009 documentary film Objectified, Rams states that Apple is one of the few companies designing products according to his principles. In a 2010 interview with Die Zeit, Rams mentions that Ive personally sent him an iPhone "Along with a nice letter. He thanked me for the inspiration that my work was to him". Ive also wrote the foreword for a 2011 Rams monograph, Dieter Rams: As Little Design as Possible.

The designer Jasper Morrison has spoken of his grandfather's Rams designed Braun "Snow White's Coffin" being an "important influence on [his] choice in becoming a designer."

== Ten Principles for Good design ==
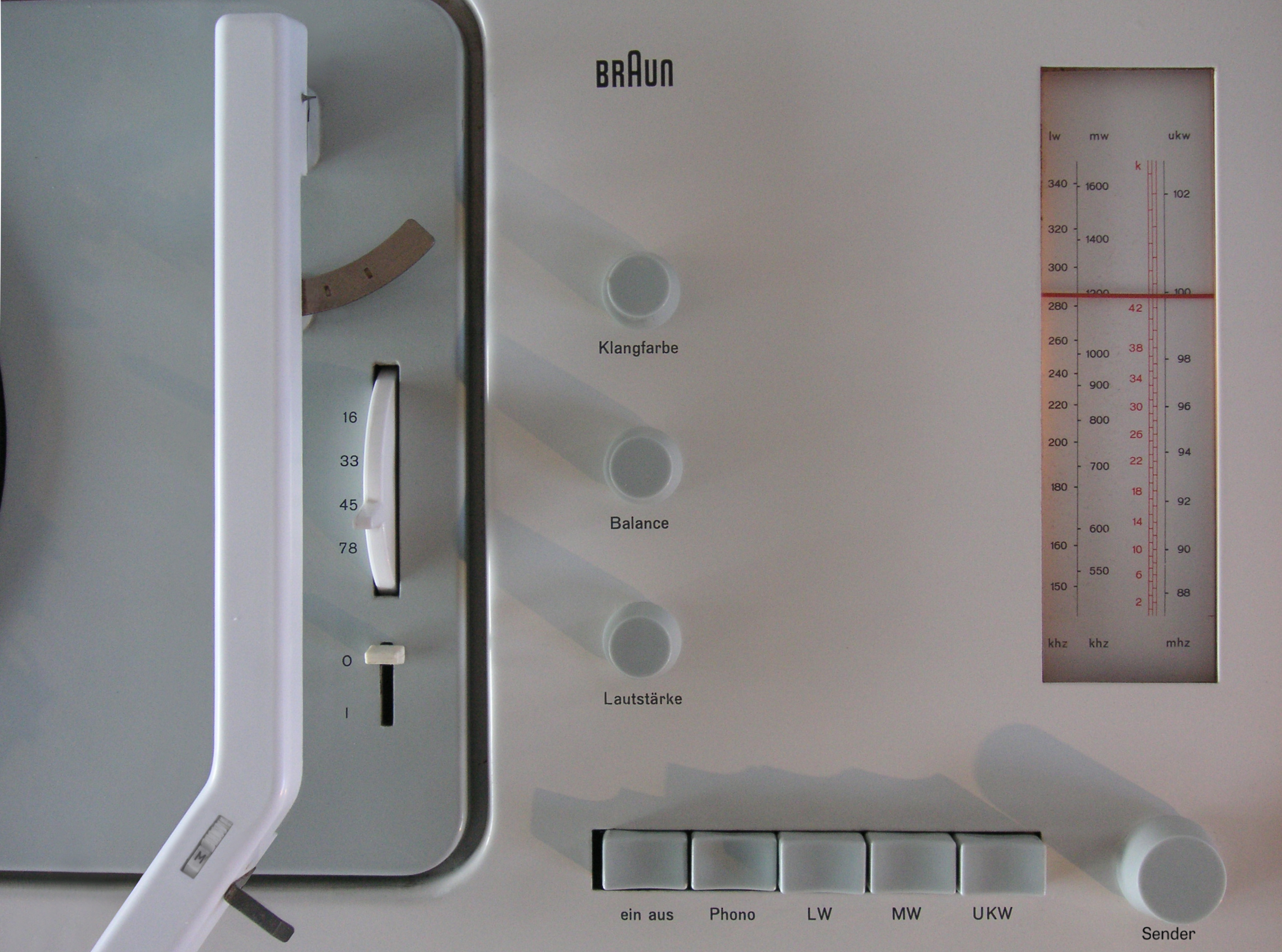
Braun SK 61

Rams introduced the idea of sustainable development, and of obsolescence being a crime in design, in the 1970s. Accordingly, he asked himself the question: "Is my design a good design?" The answer he formed became the basis for his celebrated Ten Principles for Good design ('10 Grundsätze für gutes Design'). According to Rams, "good design":

1. is innovative – The possibilities for progression are not, by any means, exhausted. Technological development is always offering new opportunities for original designs. But imaginative design always develops in tandem with improving technology, and can never be an end in itself.
2. makes a product useful – A product is bought to be used. It has to satisfy not only functional, but also psychological and aesthetic criteria. Good design emphasizes the usefulness of a product whilst disregarding anything that could detract from it.
3. is aesthetic – The aesthetic quality of a product is integral to its usefulness because products are used every day and have an effect on people and their well-being. Only well-executed objects can be beautiful.
4. makes a product understandable – It clarifies the product’s structure. Better still, it can make the product clearly express its function by making use of the user's intuition. At best, it is self-explanatory.
5. is unobtrusive – Products fulfilling a purpose are like tools. They are neither decorative objects nor works of art. Their design should therefore be both neutral and restrained, to leave room for the user's self-expression.
6. is honest – It does not make a product appear more innovative, powerful or valuable than it really is. It does not attempt to manipulate the consumer with promises that cannot be kept.
7. is long-lasting – It avoids being fashionable and therefore never appears antiquated. Unlike fashionable design, it lasts many years – even in today's throwaway society.
8. is thorough down to the last detail – Nothing must be arbitrary or left to chance. Care and accuracy in the design process show respect towards the consumer.
9. is environmentally friendly – Design makes an important contribution to the preservation of the environment. It conserves resources and minimizes physical and visual pollution throughout the lifecycle of the product.
10. is as little design as possible – Less, but better. Simple as possible but not simpler. Good design elevates the essential functions of a product.

== Exhibitions and recognition ==
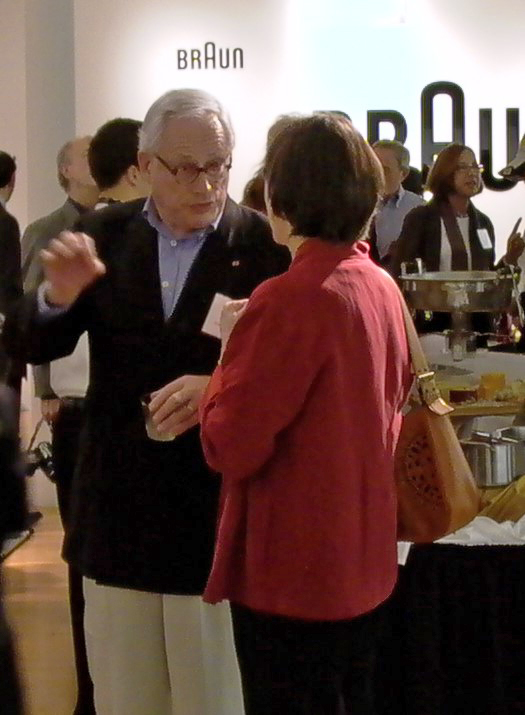
Rams at the 50th Anniversary of Braun Innovation exhibition, Boston (2005)

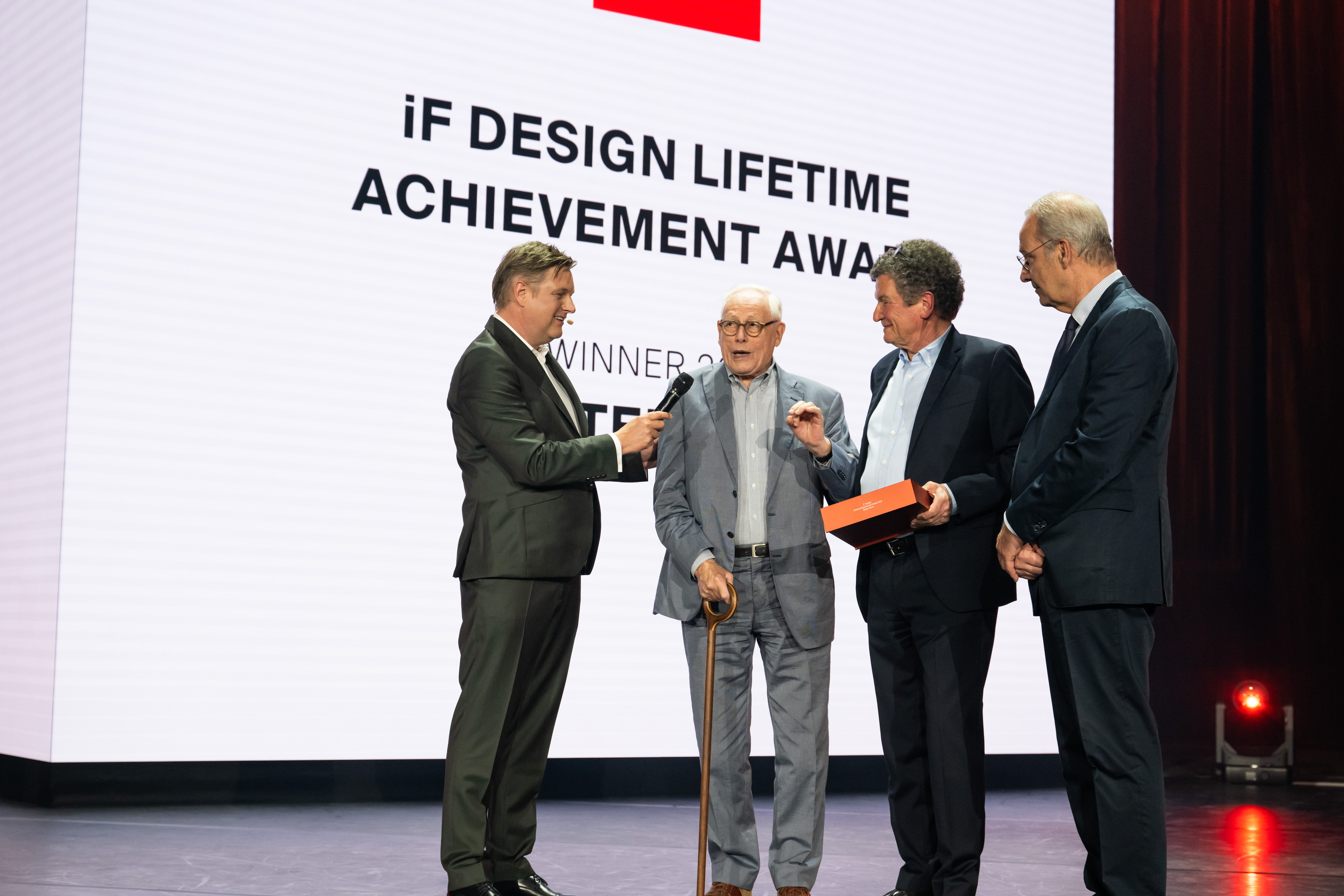
Rams honoured with iF Design Lifetime Achievement Award, Friedrichstadt-Palast, Berlin (2024)

Rams has been involved in design for seven decades and has received many honorary appellations throughout his career.

=== Awards and honours ===
- 1960: Received Kulturkreis im Bundesverband der Deutschen Industrie
- 1961: TP1 portable record player and radio received Supreme Award at Interplas exhibition, London
- 1963: F21 received ‘Supreme Award’ at Interplas exhibition, London
- 1965: Berliner Kunstpreise 'Bildende Kunst, Junge Generation' (with Reinhold Weiss, Richard Fischer, and Robert Oberheim)
- 1968: Honorary Member, Royal Designers for Industry of the British Royal Society of Arts
- 1969: 620 chair awarded gold medal at the International Furniture Exhibition in Vienna
- 1978: Awarded SIAD Medal of the Society of Industrial Artists and Designers, UK
- 1985: Awarded Académico de Honor Extranjero by the Academia Mexicana de Diseño, Mexico
- 1989: First recipient of the Industrie Forum Design Hannover, Germany, for special contribution to design
- 1989: Awarded Doctor honoris causa by Royal College of Art, London, UK
- 1992: Received Ikea prize and uses prize money for his own Dieter and Ingeborg Rams Foundation for the promotion of design
- 1996: Received World Design Medal from the Industrial Designers Society of America
- 2002: Awarded Commander's Cross of the Order of Merit of the Federal Republic of Germany (German: Verdienstkreuz des Verdienstordens der Bundesrepublik Deutschland)
- 2003: Received Design Award ONDI, Havana, Cuba for his special contribution to industrial design and world culture
- 2007: Awarded Design Prize of the Federal Republic of Germany for his life’s work
- 2007: Received Lucky Strike Designer Award from the Raymond Loewy Foundation
- 2009: Awarded the great design prize in Australia.
- 2010: Kölner Klopfer prize awarded by the students of the Cologne International School of Design
- 2012: Red Dot Design Award and iF Product Design Award, for the BN0106 digital chronograph
- 2013: Awarded Lifetime Achievement Medal at London Design Festival
- 2014: Compasso d'Oro Career Award from the Associazione per il Disegno Industriale (ADI), Milan
- 2024: He became the first recipient of the iF Design Lifetime Achievement award
- 2024: DesignEuropa lifetime achievement award
- 2025: The World Design Organisation awarded the World Design Medal to 93-year-old Dieter Rams for being "one of the most influential design voices of the 20th century, having set new standards for clarity, functionality and timelessness in design."

=== Less and More exhibition ===
Less and More is an exhibition of Rams's landmark designs for Braun and Vitsœ. It first traveled to Japan in 2008 and 2009, appearing at the Suntory Museum in Osaka and the Fuchu Art Museum in Tokyo. Between November 2009 and March 2010 it appeared at the Design Museum in London. It appeared at the Museum für Angewandte Kunst in Frankfurt from July to September 2010. The exhibit then appeared at the San Francisco Museum of Modern Art from August 2011 to February 2012.

=== Rams documentary ===
On 22 June 2016, filmmaker Gary Hustwit announced his documentary Rams and launched a Kickstarter campaign for the project. The full-length documentary features in-depth conversations with Rams about his design philosophy, the process behind some of his most iconic designs, his inspiration and his regrets. Some of the funds raised in the Kickstarter campaign also helped to preserve Rams's design archive in cooperation with the Dieter and Ingeborg Rams Foundation.

=== Dieter Rams. Modular World ===
In 2016, the Vitra Design Museum staged an exhibition titled "Dieter Rams. Modular World" focusing on Rams "obsession with grids and shelving".

=== Dieter Rams. A Style Room ===
In 2022, the Museum für Angewandte Kunst in Frankfurt updated and expanded its permanent display titled "Dieter Rams. A Style Room" to mark the designer's 90th birthday. The exhibit also includes photographs by Ram's wife Ingeborg.

=== Dieter Rams. Looking back and ahead exhibition ===
In 2021 an exhibition of approximately 30 works, 100 photographs, and information panels opened at the Museum Angewandte Kunst. The exhibit was subsequently on view at the Goethe Institute in New York in 2022, and the ADI Design Museum in Milan in 2023.

== In popular culture ==
Furniture and objects designed by Rams are used on the sets of the American television series Severance. Jeremy Hindle, the production designer for the series described the show's aesthetic as having "a Dieter Rams look to it.”

== Personal life ==
Rams met his wife Ingeborg Kracht-Rams in 1955 while she was working as a photographer for Braun.

== Gallery of works ==
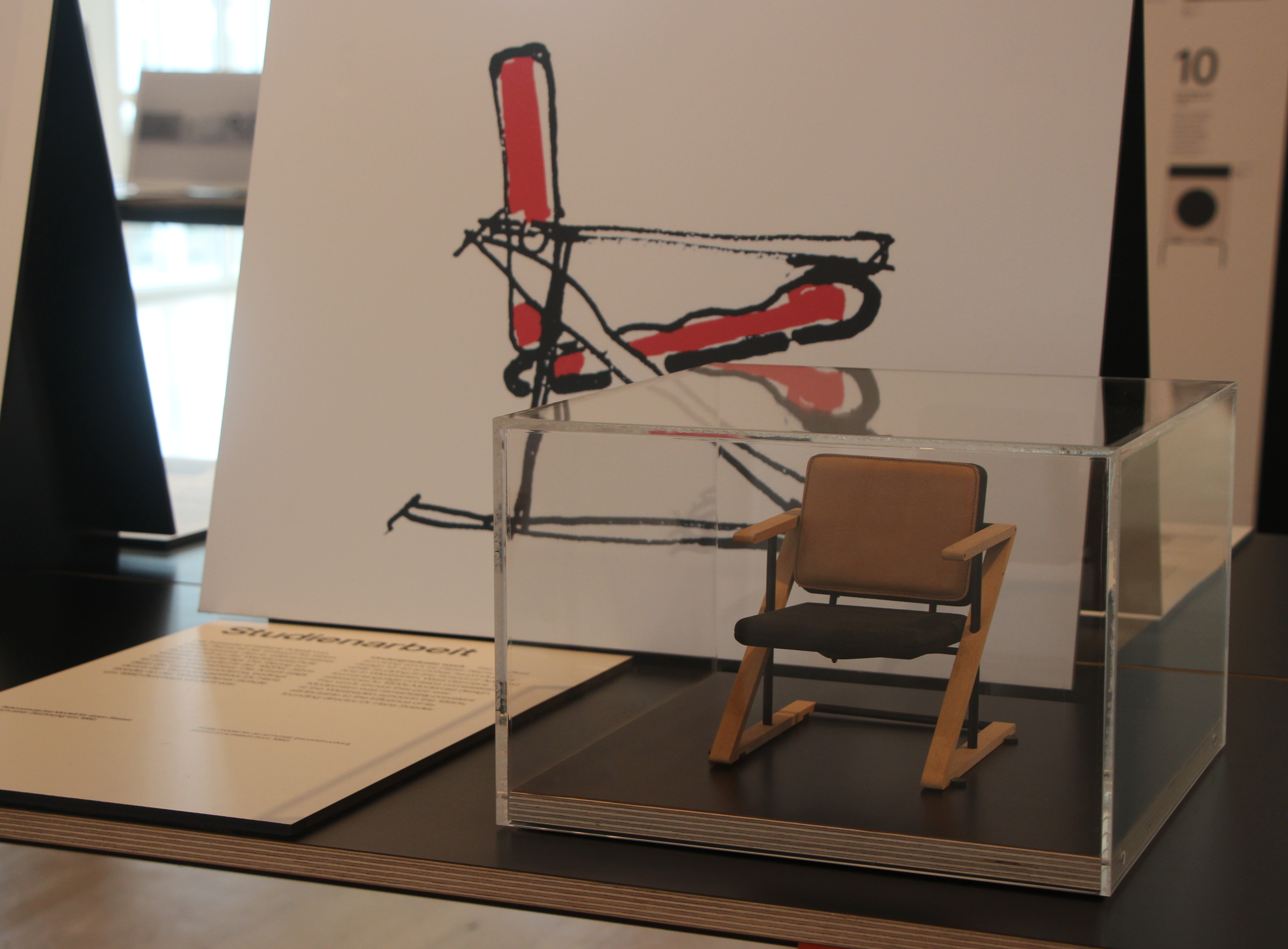
Scale model of a chair (undergraduate work c. 1952)

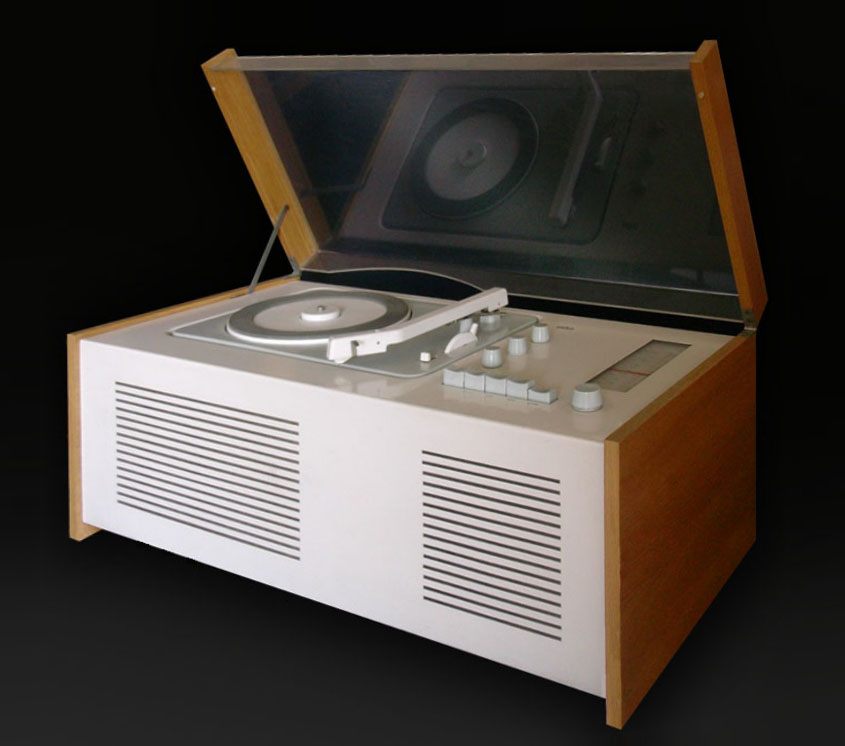
Braun SK 61 radiogram, 1956

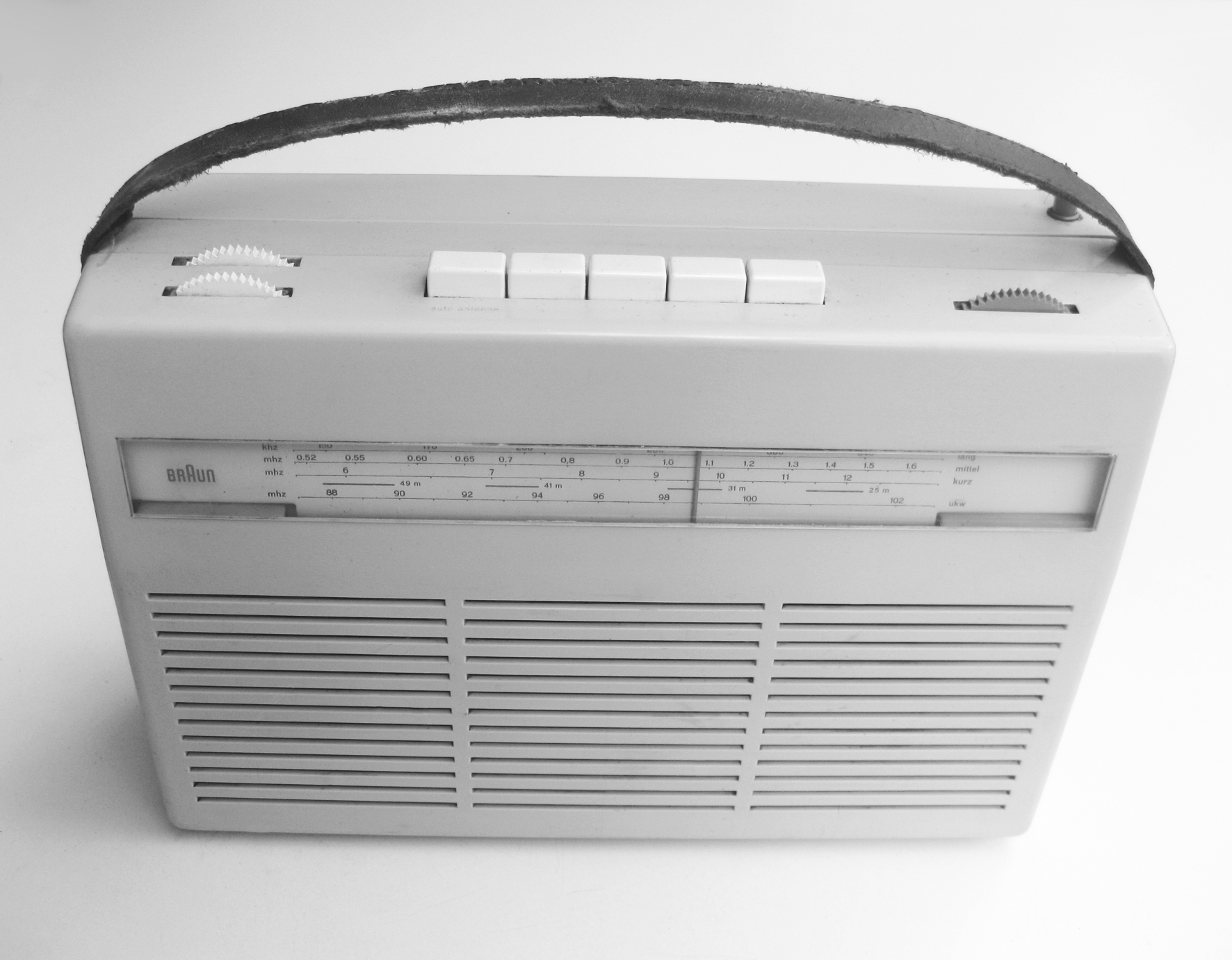
Braun Transistor 1 radio, 1957

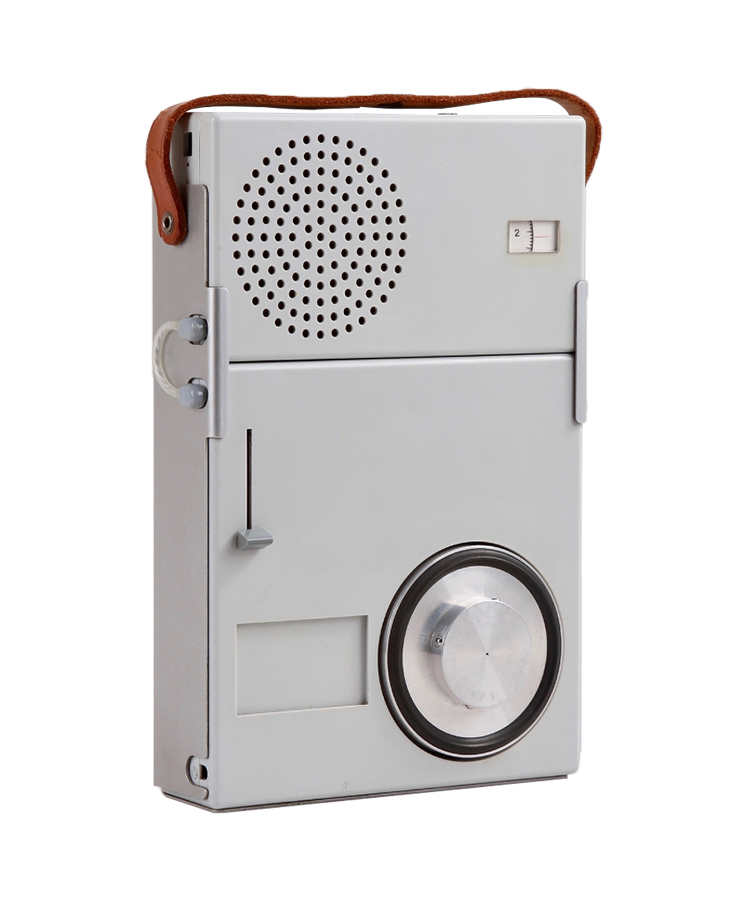
Braun TP1 portable transistor radio and phonograph, 1959

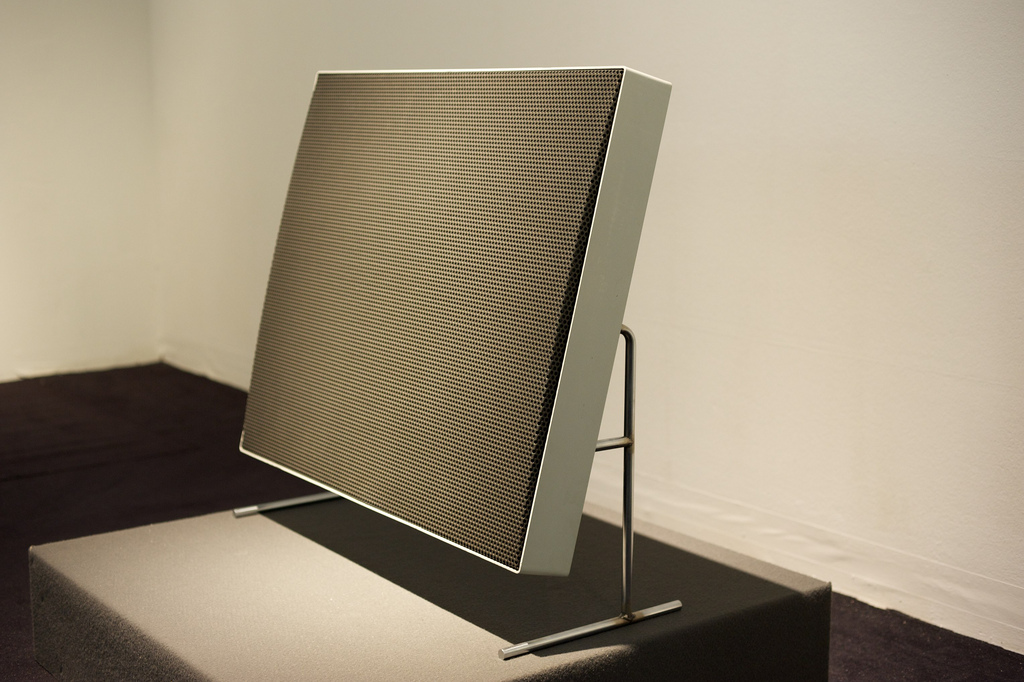
Braun LE 1 speaker, 1959

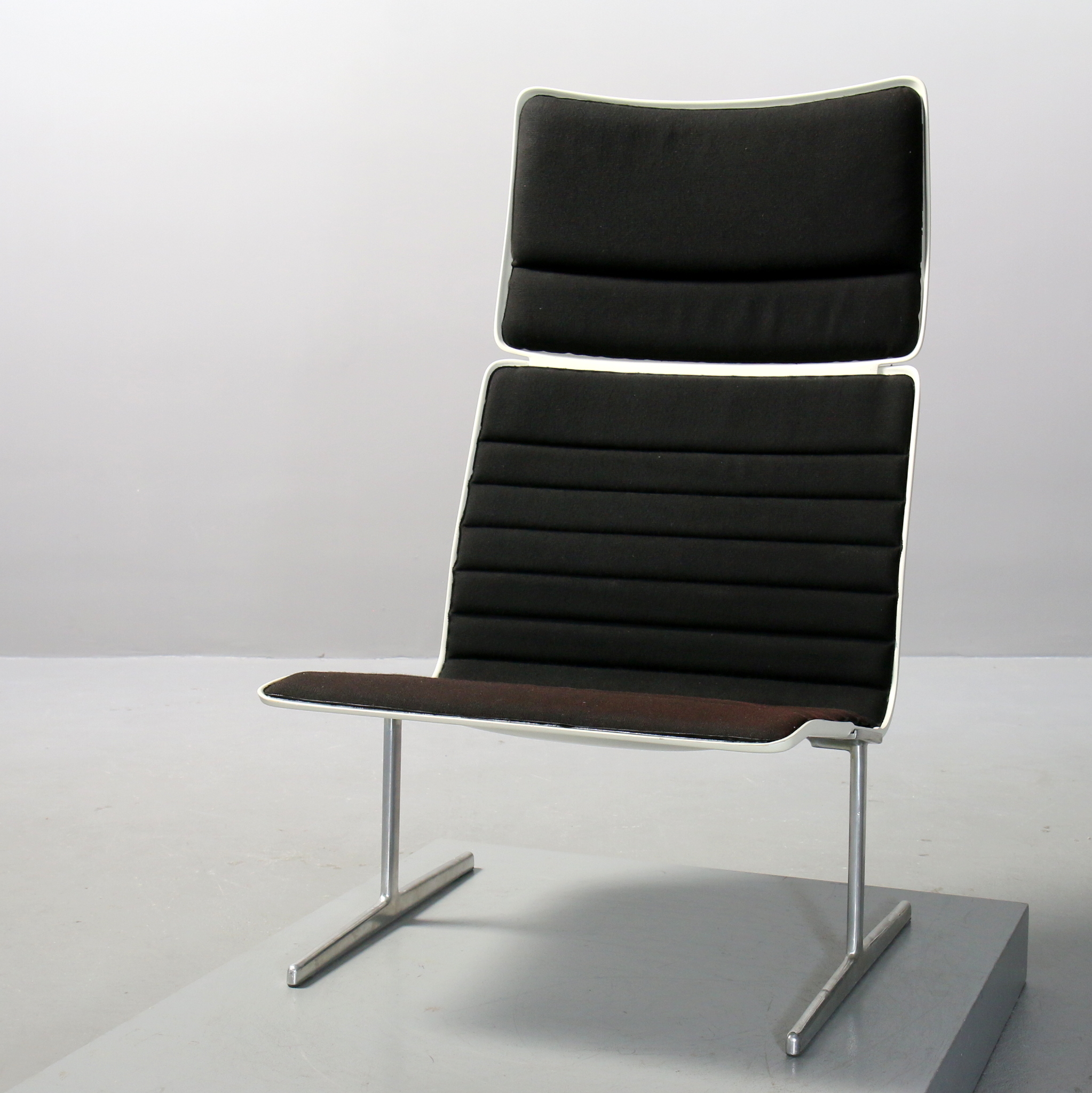
Vitsœ Model 601 lounge chair, 1960

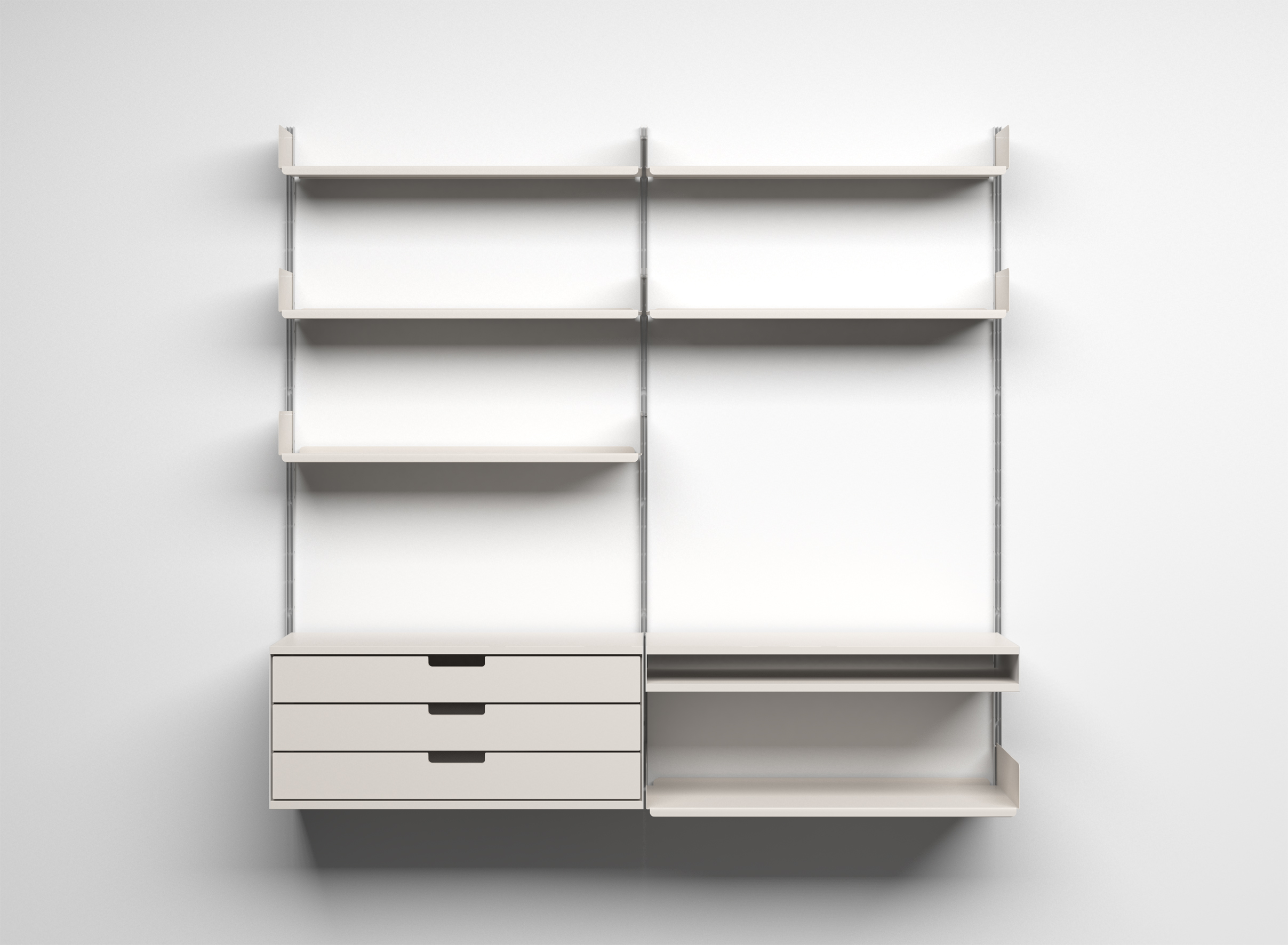
Vitsœ 606 Universal Shelving System, 1960

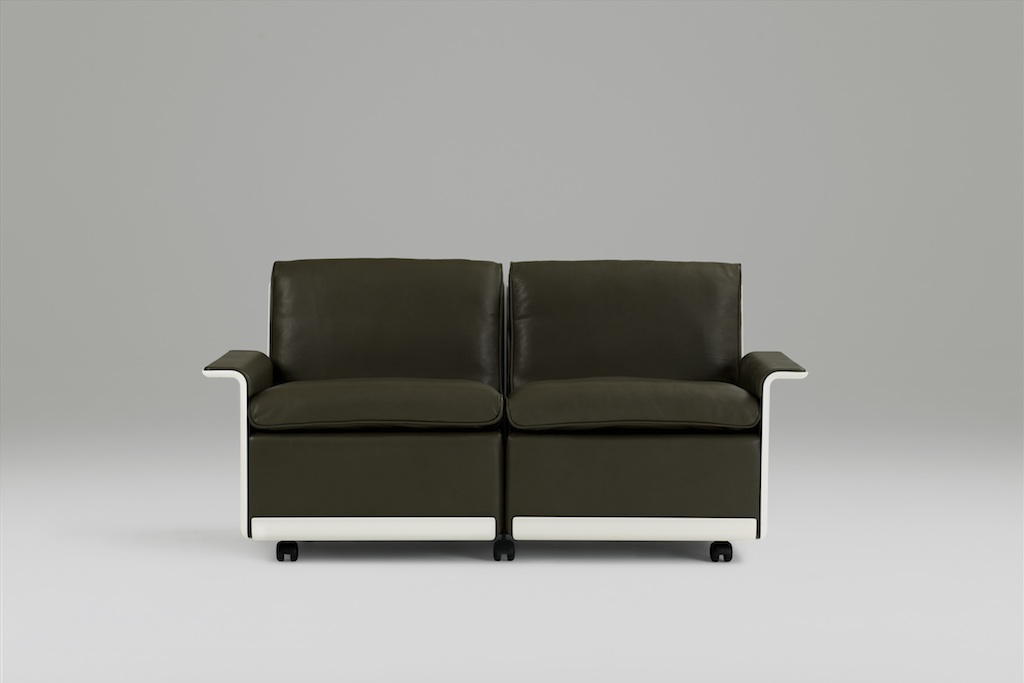
Vitsœ 620 Chair Programme, 1962

Braun tone arm scale, 1962

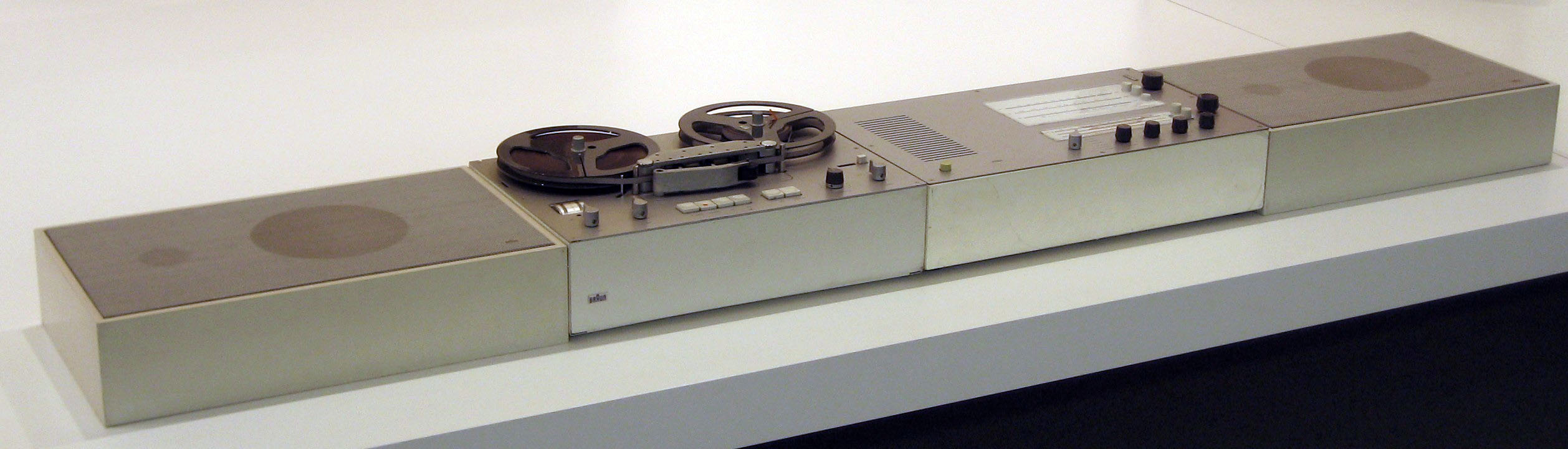
Braun TS 45, TG 60, L 450, 1964–1965

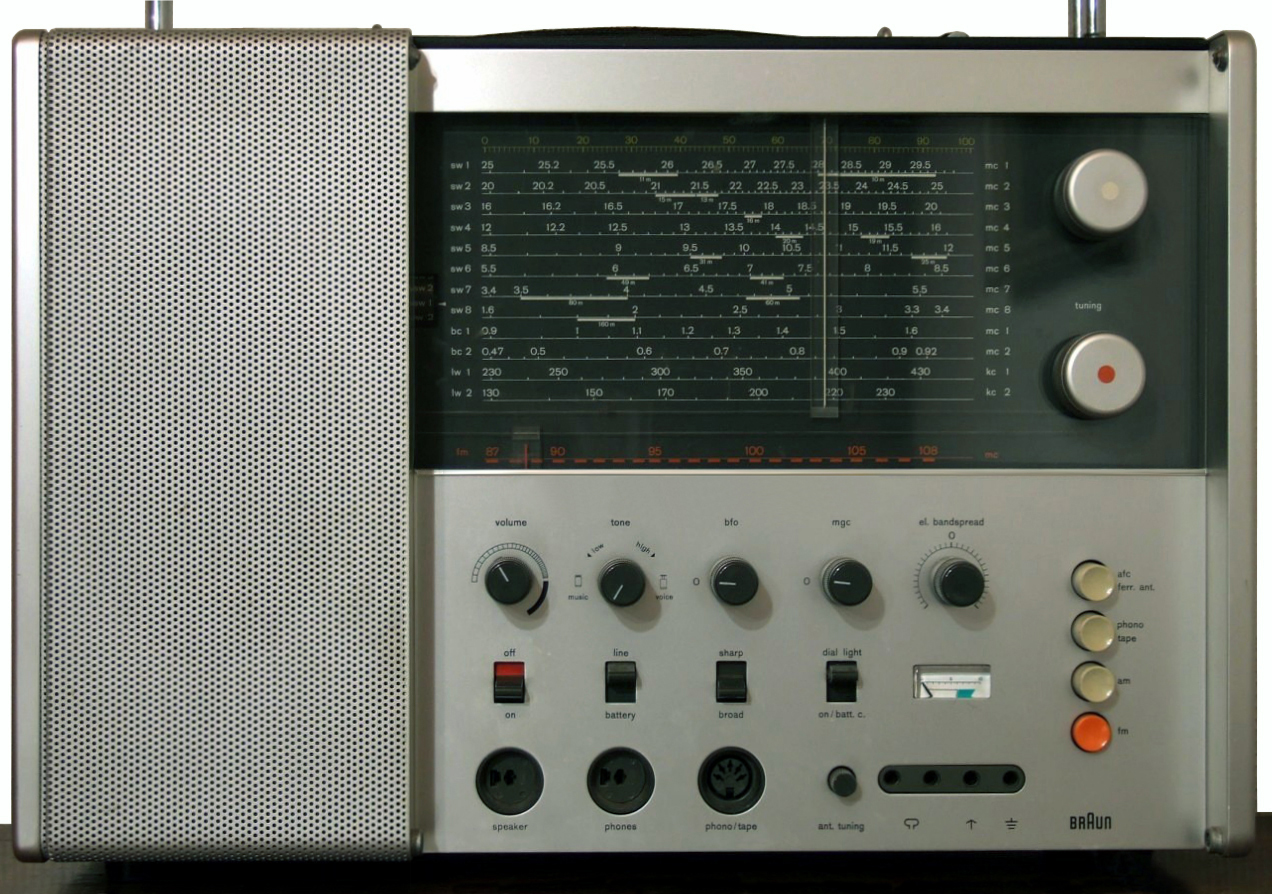
Braun T 1000 CD shortwave radio receiver, 1968

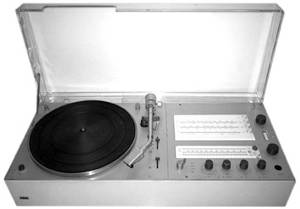
Braun audio 310, early 1970s

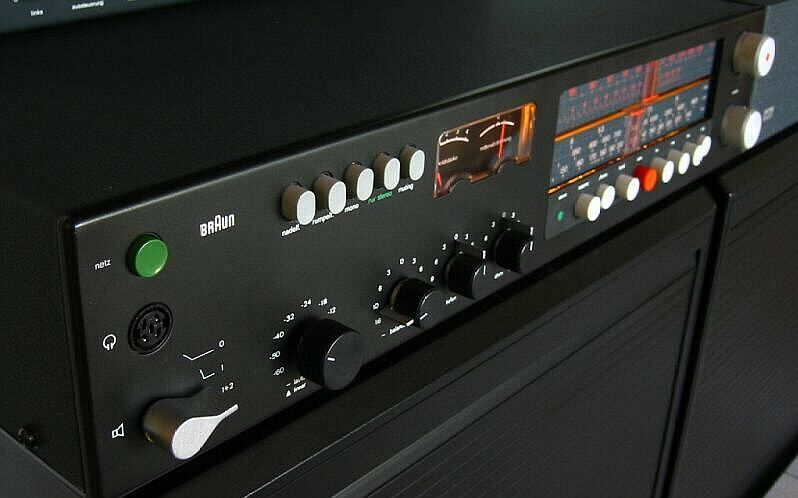
Braun Regie 510 stereo receiver, 1972

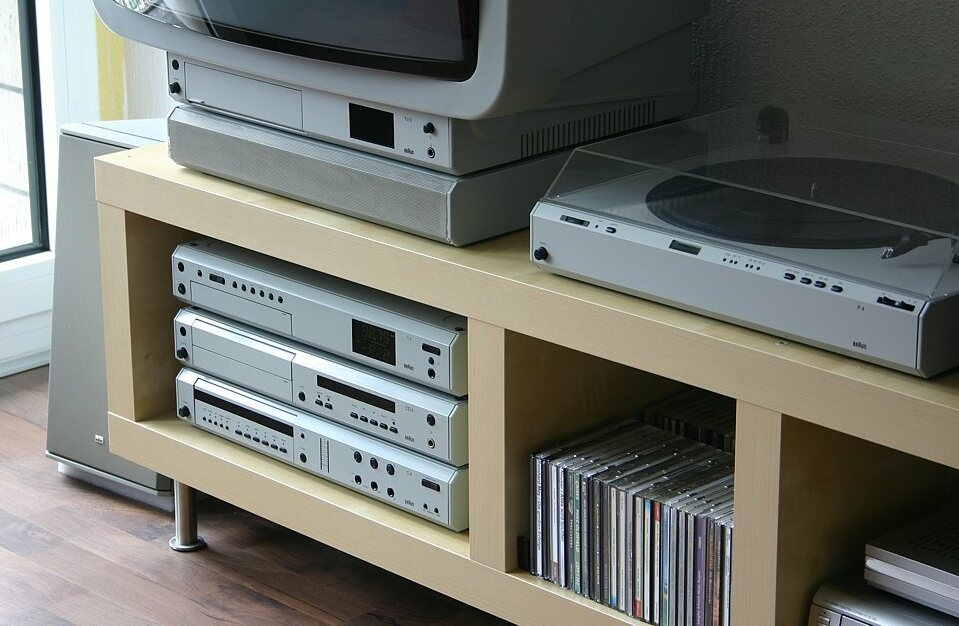
Braun Atelier series, 1979 to 1991

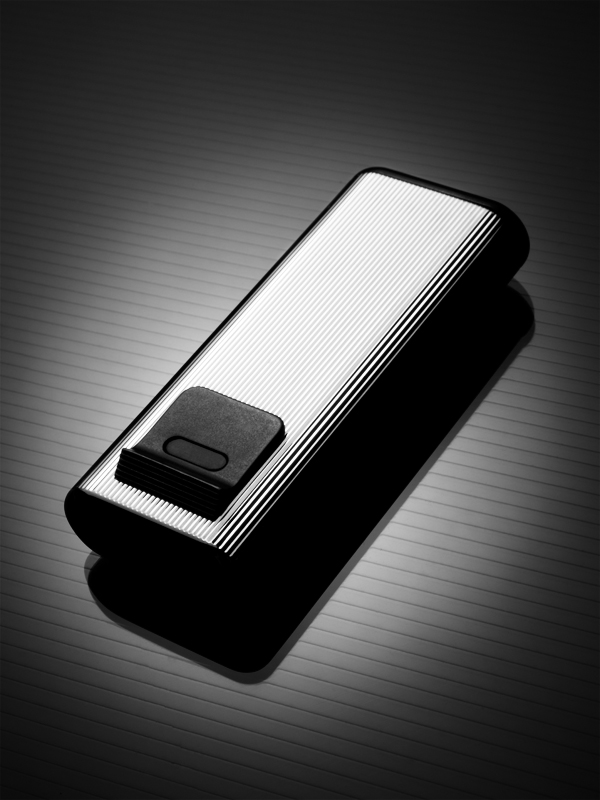
Braun lighter, early 1980s

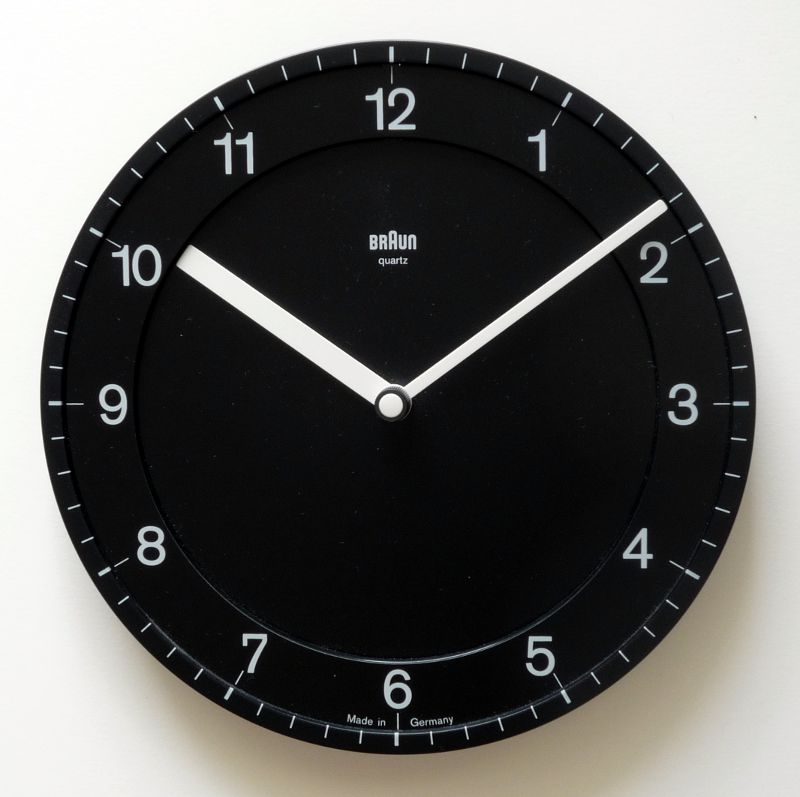
Braun ABW 30 clock, 1982

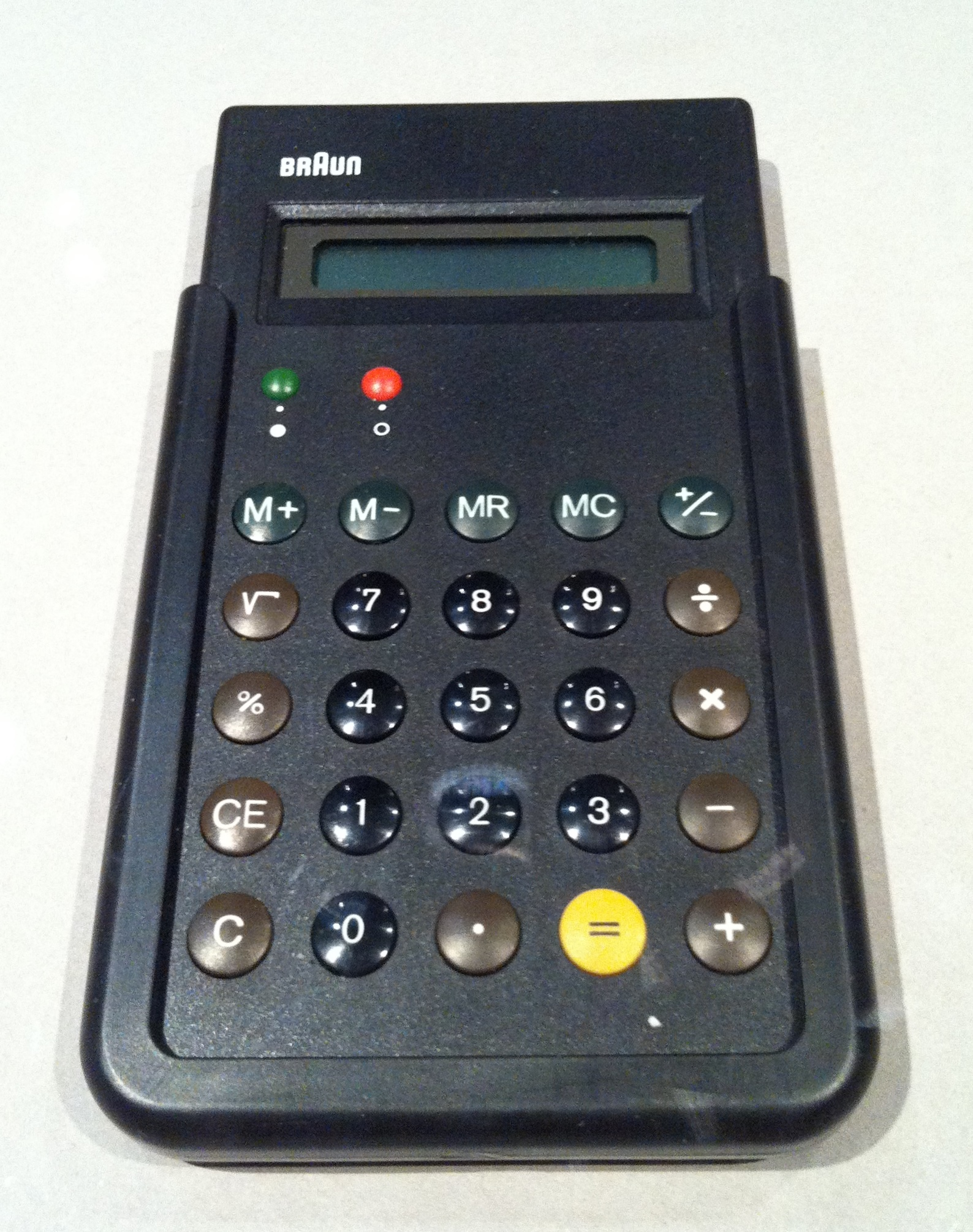
Braun ET 66 calculator, 1987

== See also ==
- Firmness, commodity, and delight – 3 principles of good architecture
- Form follows function – Design philosophy of 19th–20th centuries
- Grice's maxims – Pragmatics of conversational communication
- KISS principle – Design principle preferring simplicity
- Less is more – Design principle
- Truth to materials – Architectural principle
