= Tom Palin =

British painter

Tom Palin is a British painter.

== Education ==
Palin grew up in Birkenhead, Merseyside, England. He graduated from Liverpool John Moores University with a BA (Hons) in Fine Art, and from the University of Manchester with an MA in Art History. He completed a PhD in Painting at the Royal College of Art.

== Painting ==
Tom Palin's work consists, for the most part, of small scale oil paintings. These explore the boundaries between abstraction and figuration and combine an interest in the iconography of the everyday and of the romantic with a concern for the material surface of paint and the passing of time. His work appears as muted, painterly and, in narrative terms, ambiguous. He cites Maurice Utrillo as a major influence. His work can be found in The University of Liverpool's Art Collection. Tom Palin is included in The Dictionary of Artists in Britain since 1945 (David Buckman, 2006).

He has exhibited his work in a number of solo and collaborative exhibitions, including solo shows at: Leeds Arts University, (Leeds 2018 and 2010), The Central Gallery (Ashton-under-Lyne, 2010), View 2 Gallery (Liverpool, 2008), Dean Clough (Halifax, 2005) and at The Atkinson Art Gallery and Library, (Southport, 2004).

Palin teaches painting at the Royal College of Art and the Open College of the Arts. He has written about medium specificity, abstract art and the work of Maurice Utrillo.

== Awards ==
Tom Palin has been the recipient of the British Institution Award, Royal Academy Summer Exhibition, Burlington House, London, 2015, the Gilchrist-Fisher Memorial Award for Landscape Painters (Rebecca Hossack Gallery, 2004), and the Hunting Art Prize Young Artist of the Year Award (Royal College of Art, 2000).

== Residencies ==
He held The Feiweles Trust Bursary Award in 2002 which saw the completion of 100 art workshops in the West Yorkshire region and culminated in the exhibition Pride of Place: A Painter's Perspective, at the Yorkshire Sculpture Park.
