= Form follows function =

Design philosophy of 19th–20th centuries

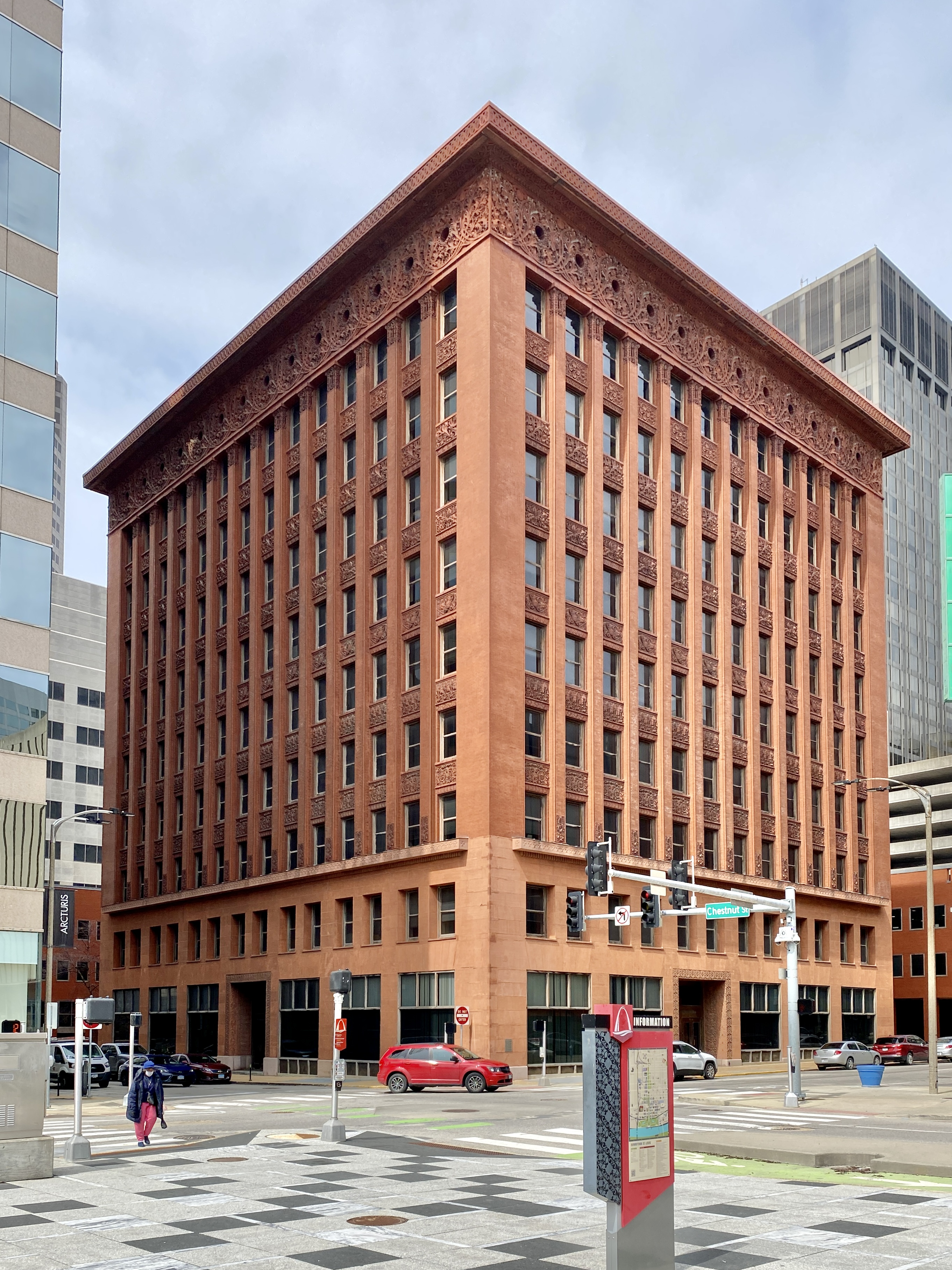
The Wainwright Building in St. Louis, Missouri, designed by Louis Sullivan and built in 1891, is emblematic of his famous maxim "form follows function".

Form follows function is a principle of design associated with late 19th- and early 20th-century architecture and industrial design in general, which states that the appearance and structure of a building or object (architectural form) should primarily relate to its intended function or purpose.

== Origins of the phrase ==
The architect Louis Sullivan coined the maxim, which encapsulates Viollet-le-Duc's theories: "a rationally designed structure may not necessarily be beautiful but no building can be beautiful that does not have a rationally designed structure". Sullivan also credited his friend and mentor, John H. Edelmann, who theorized the concept of "suppressed function" with inspiration for this maxim.

The maxim is often incorrectly attributed to the sculptor Horatio Greenough (1805–1852), whose thinking mostly predates the later functionalist approach to architecture. Greenough's writings were for a long time largely forgotten, and were rediscovered only in the 1930s. In 1947, a selection of his essays was published as Form and Function: Remarks on Art by Horatio Greenough. The earliest formulation of the idea as "in architecture only that shall show that has a definite function" belongs not to an architect, but to a monk Carlo Lodoli (1690–1761), who uttered the phrase while inspired by positivist thinking (Lodoli's words were published by his student, Francesco Algarotti, in 1757).

Sullivan was Greenough's much younger compatriot and admired rationalist thinkers such as Thoreau, Emerson, Whitman, and Melville, as well as Greenough himself. In 1896, Sullivan coined the phrase in an article titled The Tall Office Building Artistically Considered, though he later attributed the core idea to the ancient Roman architect, engineer, and author Marcus Vitruvius Pollio, who first asserted in his book De architectura that a structure must exhibit the three qualities of firmness, commodity, and delight — that is, it must be solid, useful, and beautiful. Sullivan actually wrote that "form ever follows function", but the simpler and less emphatic phrase is more widely remembered. For Sullivan, this was distilled wisdom, an aesthetic credo, the single "rule that shall permit of no exception". The full quote is:

Whether it be the sweeping eagle in his flight, or the open apple-blossom, the toiling work-horse, the blithe swan, the branching oak, the winding stream at its base, the drifting clouds, over all the coursing sun, form ever follows function, and this is the law. Where function does not change, form does not change. The granite rocks, the ever-brooding hills, remain for ages; the lightning lives, comes into shape, and dies, in a twinkling.

It is the pervading law of all things organic and inorganic, of all things physical and metaphysical, of all things human and all things superhuman, of all true manifestations of the head, of the heart, of the soul, that the life is recognizable in its expression, that form ever follows function. This is the law.

Sullivan developed the shape of the tall steel skyscraper in late 19th-century Chicago at a moment in which technology, taste and economic forces converged and made it necessary to break with established styles. If the shape of the building was not going to be chosen out of the old pattern book, something had to determine form, and according to Sullivan it was going to be the purpose of the building. Thus, "form follows function", as opposed to "form follows precedent". Frank Lloyd Wright, Sullivan's assistant, extended "form follows function" into "form and function are one", believing that the two could be integrated together. In a draft of a press release for the Johnson Wax Headquarters, written in 1936, he described the building as a happy medium between "Function following Form", which he believed led to "thick buildings that carried ornament too far", and "Form follows Function", which, in his view, was irrational and only resulted in "thin buildings that look as though cut from cardboard with scissors".

== Debate on the functionality of ornamentation ==
In 1910, the Austrian architect Adolf Loos gave a lecture titled "Ornament and Crime" in reaction to the elaborate ornament used by the Vienna Secession architects. Modernists adopted Loos's moralistic argument as well as Sullivan's maxim. Loos had worked as a carpenter in the USA. He celebrated efficient plumbing and industrial artifacts like corn silos and steel water towers as examples of functional design.

== Application in different fields ==
"Form follows function" is closely associated with utilitarian design, a concept of products designed exclusively for utility ("function") instead of "contemplating pleasure".

=== Architecture ===
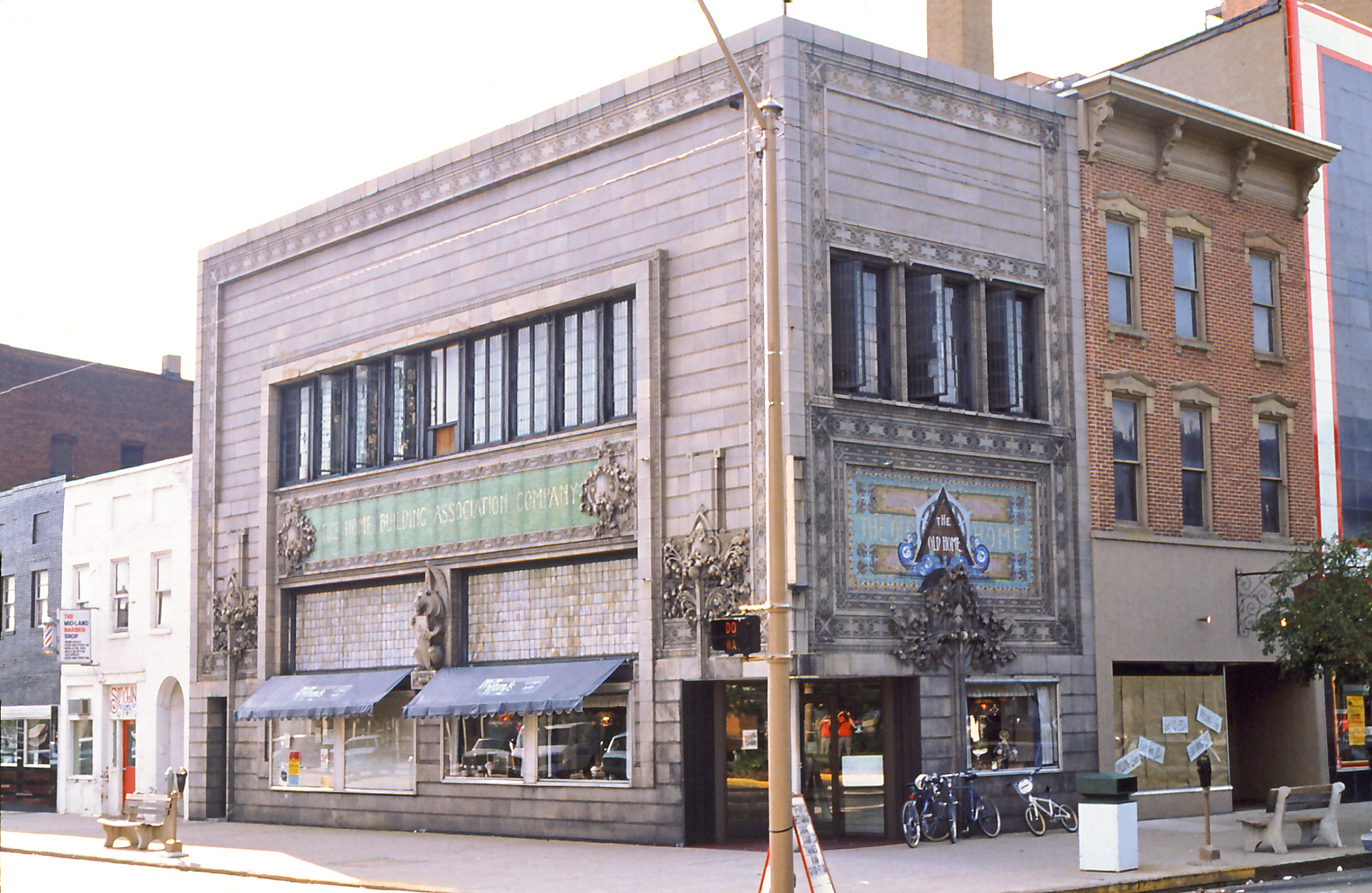
Home Building Association Bank by Sullivan

The phrase "form (ever) follows function" became a battle cry of Modernist architects after the 1930s. The credo was taken to imply that decorative elements, which architects call "ornament", were superfluous in modern buildings. The phrase can best be implemented in design by asking the question, "Does it work?" Design in architecture utilizing this mantra follows the functionality and purpose of the building. For example, a family home would be designed around familial and social interactions and life. It would be purposeful, without functionless flare. A building's beauty comes from the function it serves rather than from its visual design. One aim of the Modernists after World War II was to elevate the living conditions of the masses. Many people around the world were living in less than ideal conditions, worsened by war. The Modernists sought to bring these people into more livable, humane spaces that, while not conventionally beautiful, were extremely functional. As a result, architecture utilizing "form follows function" became a sign of hope and progress.

Despite coining the term, Louis Sullivan himself neither thought nor designed along such lines at the peak of his career. Indeed, while his buildings could be spare and crisp in their principal masses, he often punctuated their plain surfaces with eruptions of lush Art Nouveau and Celtic Revival decorations, usually cast in iron or terracotta, and ranging from organic forms like vines and ivy, to more geometric designs, and interlace, inspired by his Irish design heritage. Probably the most famous example is the writhing green ironwork that covers the entrance canopies of the Carson, Pirie, Scott and Company Building on South State Street in Chicago. These ornaments, often executed by the talented younger draftsmen in Sullivan's employ, would eventually become Sullivan's trademark; to students of architecture, they are his instantly recognizable signature.

=== Automobile designing ===
If the design of an automobile conforms to its function—for instance, the Fiat Multipla's shape, which is partly due to the desire to sit six people in two rows—then its form is said to follow its function.

=== Product design ===
One episode in the history of the inherent conflict between functional design and the demands of the marketplace took place in 1935, after the introduction of the streamlined Chrysler Airflow, when the American auto industry temporarily halted attempts to introduce optimal aerodynamic forms into mass manufacture. Some car-makers thought aerodynamic efficiency would result in a single optimal auto-body shape, a "teardrop" shape, which would not be good for unit sales. General Motors adopted two different positions on streamlining, one meant for its internal engineering community, the other meant for its customers. Like the annual model year change, so-called aerodynamic styling is often meaningless in terms of technical performance. Subsequently, drag coefficient has become both a marketing tool and a means of improving the sale-ability of a car by reducing its fuel consumption, slightly, and increasing its top speed, markedly.

The American industrial designers of the 1930s and 1940s like Raymond Loewy, Norman Bel Geddes and Henry Dreyfuss grappled with the inherent contradictions of "form follows function" as they redesigned blenders and locomotives and duplicating machines for mass-market consumption. Loewy formulated his "MAYA" (Most Advanced Yet Acceptable) principle to express that product designs are bound by functional constraints of math and materials and logic, but their acceptance is constrained by social expectations. His advice was that for very new technologies, they should be made as familiar as possible, but for familiar technologies, they should be made surprising.

Victor Papanek (1923–1998) was one influential twentieth-century designer and design philosopher who taught and wrote as a proponent of "form follows function".

By honestly applying "form follows function", industrial designers had the potential to put their clients out of business. Some simple single-purpose objects like screwdrivers and pencils and teapots might be reducible to a single optimal form, precluding product differentiation. Some objects made too durable would prevent sales of replacements (see Planned obsolescence). From the standpoint of functionality, some products are simply unnecessary.

An alternative approach referred to as "form leads function" (form flows function), or "function follows form", starts with vague, abstract, or underspecified designs. These designs, sometimes generated using tools like text-to-image models, can serve as triggers for generating novel ideas for product design.

=== Software engineering ===
It has been argued that the structure and internal quality attributes of a working, non-trivial software artifact will represent first and foremost the engineering requirements of its construction, with the influence of process being marginal, if any. This does not mean that process is irrelevant, but that processes compatible with an artifact's requirements lead to roughly similar results.

The principle can also be applied to enterprise application architectures of modern business, where "function" encompasses the business processes which should be assisted by the enterprise architecture, or "form". If the architecture were to dictate how the business operates, then the business is likely to suffer from inflexibility and the inability to adapt to change. Service-oriented architecture enables an enterprise architect to rearrange the "form" of the architecture to meet the functional requirements of a business by adopting standards-based communication protocols which enable interoperability. This stands in conflict with Conway's law, which states from a social point of view that "form follows organization".

Furthermore, domain-driven design postulates that structure (software architecture, design pattern, implementation) should emerge from constraints of the modeled domain (functional requirement).

While "form" and "function" may be more or less explicit and invariant concepts to the many engineering doctrines, metaprogramming and the functional programming paradigm lend themselves well to explore, blur and invert the essence of those two concepts.

The agile software development movement espouses techniques such as "test-driven development", in which the engineer begins with a minimum unit of user-oriented functionality, creates an automated test for this and then implements the functionality and iterates, repeating this process. The result and argument for this discipline are that the structure or "form" emerges from actual function, and in fact because done organically, makes the project more adaptable long-term, as well of as higher-quality because of the functional base of automated tests.

== See also ==
- Aesthetics
- Design science (methodology)
- Separation of content and presentation
- Ten Principles for Good design
- The purpose of a system is what it does
- Truth to materials
- User-centered design
