= Vitsœ =

British furniture company

- Formerly: Vitsœ & Zapf
- Industry: manufacturing
- Founded: 1959; 66 years ago
- Founder: Niels Wiese Vitsœ, Otto Zapf
- Headquarters: Leamington Spa, England
- Areas served: 70+ countries
- Key people: Dieter Rams, Mark Adams
- Products: Shelving and seating
- Website: vitsoe.com

Vitsœ, formerly known as Vitsœ-Zapf or Vitsœ & Zapf, is a British furniture company, originally German, known for its collaboration with Dieter Rams. Its furniture is widely known as a German design classic. The 620 system is currently used in the German Chancellery.

== History ==
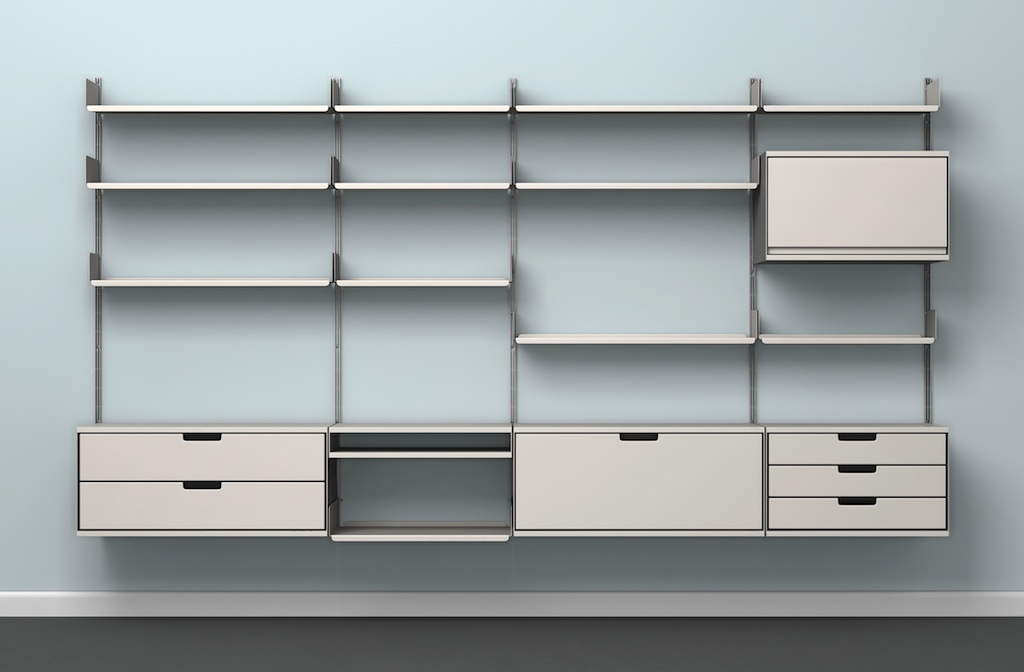
606 Universal Shelving System designed by Dieter Rams

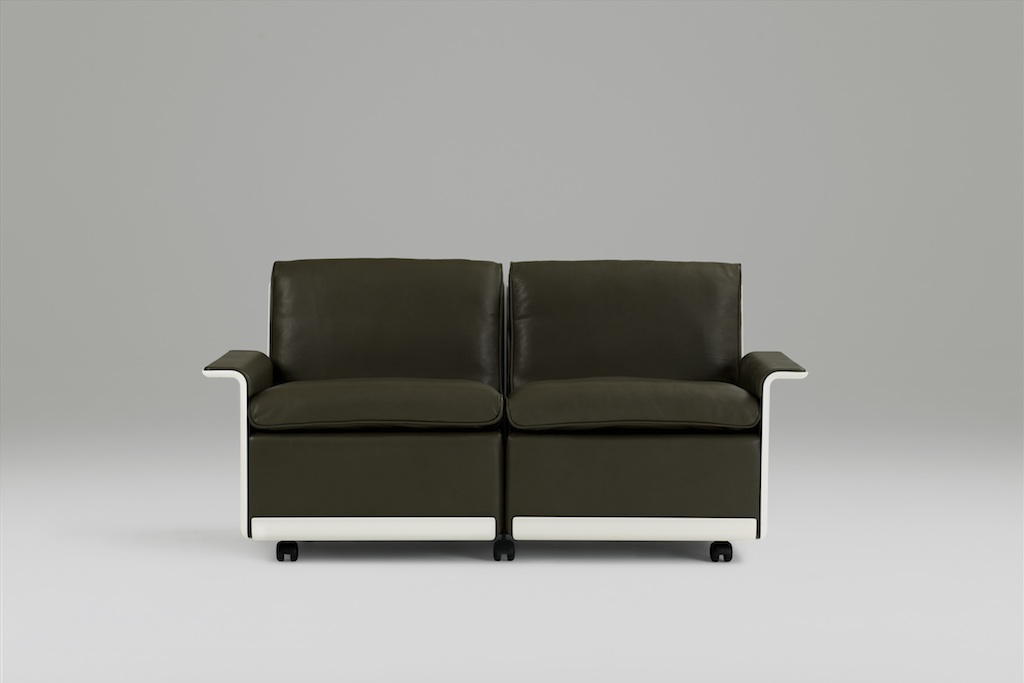
620 Chair Programme designed by Dieter Rams

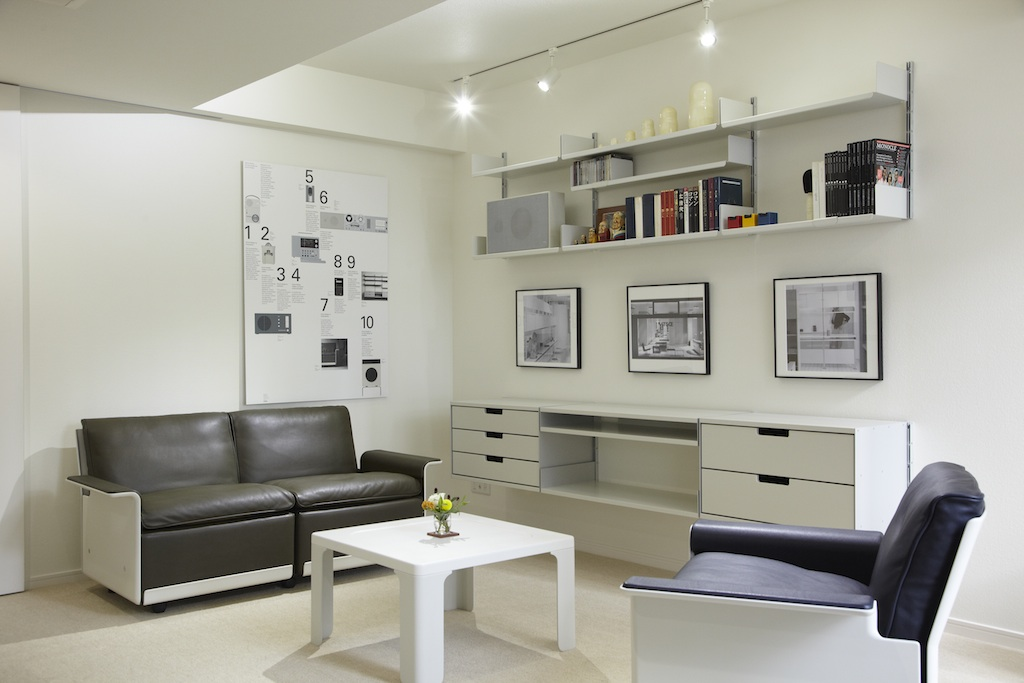
Dieter Rams' Vitsœ furniture collection (606 Universal Shelving, 620 Chair Programme, and 621 Table)

The company Vitsœ + Zapf was founded in Frankfurt am Main, Germany, in 1959 by Danish furniture dealer Niels Vitsœ and German industrial designer Otto Zapf to produce furniture designed by Dieter Rams, who was already working for the consumer products company, Braun. Rams produced numerous furniture designs for Vitsœ, including the 606 Universal Shelving System and the 620 Chair programme. Otto Zapf left the company in 1969 and it was renamed simply ‘Vitsœ’.

Following several years of financial difficulties, the company was rescued by managing director Mark Adams in the 1990s, and moved production to the United Kingdom. In 2017 Vitsœ moved its workshop to a new HQ and production building, purpose-built out of wood and glass in Royal Leamington Spa, in central England.

== Products ==
Vitsœ produces and sells the 606 Universal Shelving System (introduced in 1960) and the 620 Chair, both designed by Rams.

Design critic Spencer Bailey described the system as "one of the most—if not the most—functional and well-built designs I can think of."
