= Truth to materials =

Architectural principle

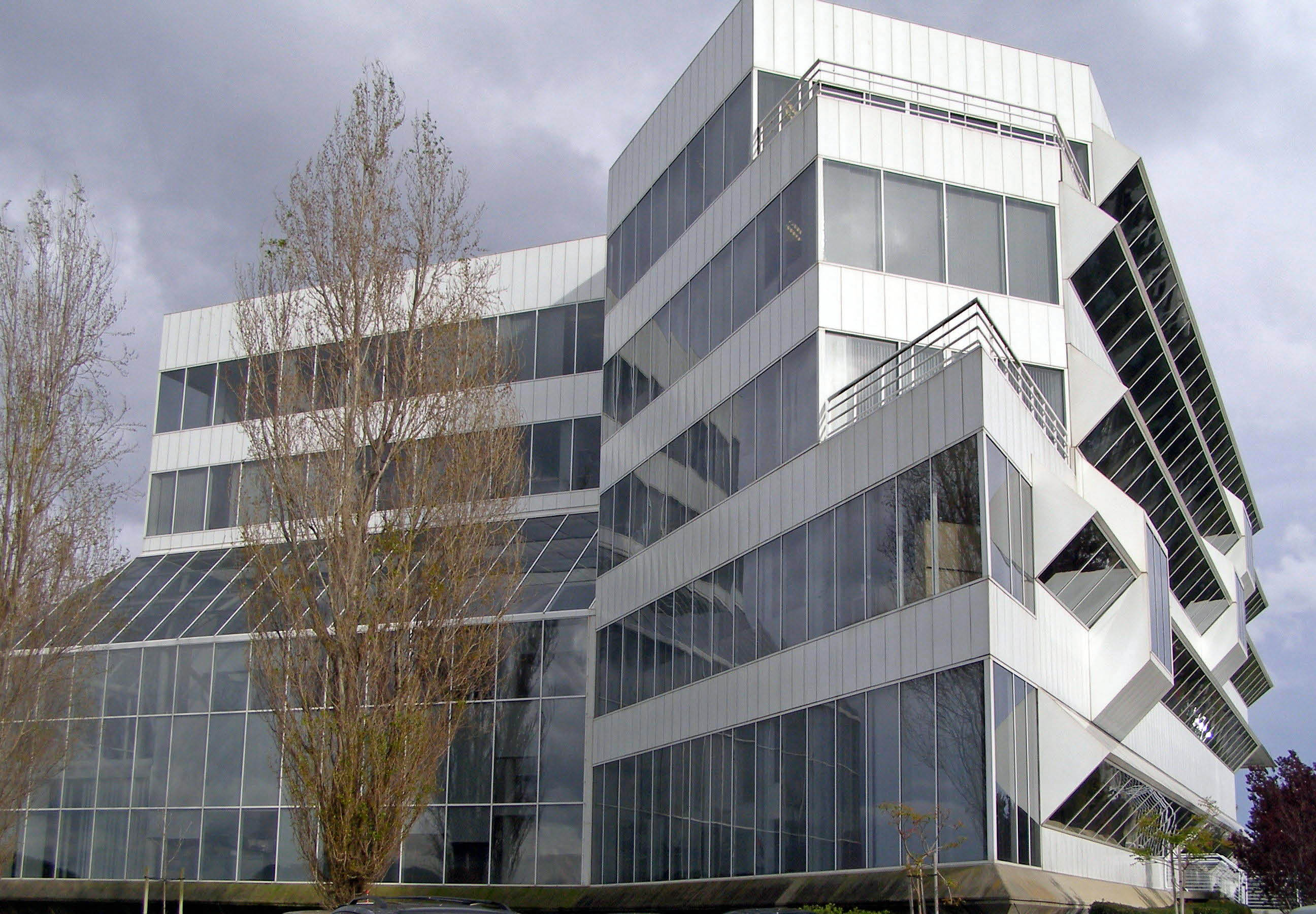
Dakin Building with exterior skin of porcelain panels.

Truth to materials is a tenet of modern architecture (as opposed to postmodern architecture), which holds that any material should be used where it is most appropriate and its nature should not be hidden. Concrete, therefore, should not be painted and the means of its construction should be celebrated by, for instance, not sanding away marks left by timber shuttering (béton brut). As another example, porcelain is infrequently used in the exterior facing of buildings, but one modern example is the Dakin Building, Brisbane, California; therefore, the porcelain panels of this building have been left uncovered by any paint or preservative.

== See also ==
- Arts and Crafts movement
- Brutalism
- Functionalism (architecture)
- Medium specificity
- Ten Principles for Good design
