= Less is more =

Design principle

Less is more is a principle found in several traditions. Its basic meaning is to keep things simple, similar to the concept of minimalism. Its use in architecture emerges from the idea that simplicity and clarity lead to good design. The concept is often associated with the modernism movement in architecture and design, although it can be applied to many fields, including art, literature, music, and lifestyle.

== Origins and philosophy ==
=== Origin of the term ===
"Less is more" can refer to architecture, art, design, writing, or philosophy. The concept dates back at least to the ancient Greeks: Chilon of Sparta made use of the famous Ancient Greek proverb: "Το λακωνίζειν εστί φιλοσοφείν", which may be roughly translated as "philosophers keep it brief" (lit. make it laconic).

Robert Browning's 1855 dramatic monologue, Andrea del Sarto (subtitled "Called the 'Faultless Painter'") uses the phrase "less is more" in the mouth of the Renaissance painter. Pope Francis adopts the conviction that "less is more" in his 2015 encyclical letter, Laudato si', noting that it is "found in different religious traditions [including] the Bible".

In architecture, the expression is often erroneously attributed to the German-American architect Ludwig Mies van der Rohe, a pioneer of modernism, who adapted this style in his architectural creations to emphasize beauty in simplicity and functionality. However, the concept of minimalism pre-dated the use of this phrase. The Bauhaus movement in Germany, with figures such as Walter Gropius and Le Corbusier, also embraced similar ideas.

=== Philosophy ===
This principle is based on the idea that removing superfluous elements enhances the clarity of the concept. It emphasizes functionality, clean aesthetics and simplicity.

== Application in design and architecture ==
=== Design ===
In industrial and graphic design, Less is more manifests itself in minimalist forms, the use of only few colors and the elimination of superfluous details. Minimalism in graphic design uses negative space, limited color palettes and simple typography to create visual impact. In industrial design, it translates into products that are both aesthetically pleasing and highly functional, often with fewer components and a more efficient use of materials.

=== Architecture ===
In architecture, this concept translates into streamlined structures, rational use of space and careful attention to layout and materials. Modern architecture saw an evolution of this concept, with architects such as Frank Lloyd Wright, who, while taking a different approach, also advocated simplicity and integration with the environment.

== Cultural influence and criticism ==
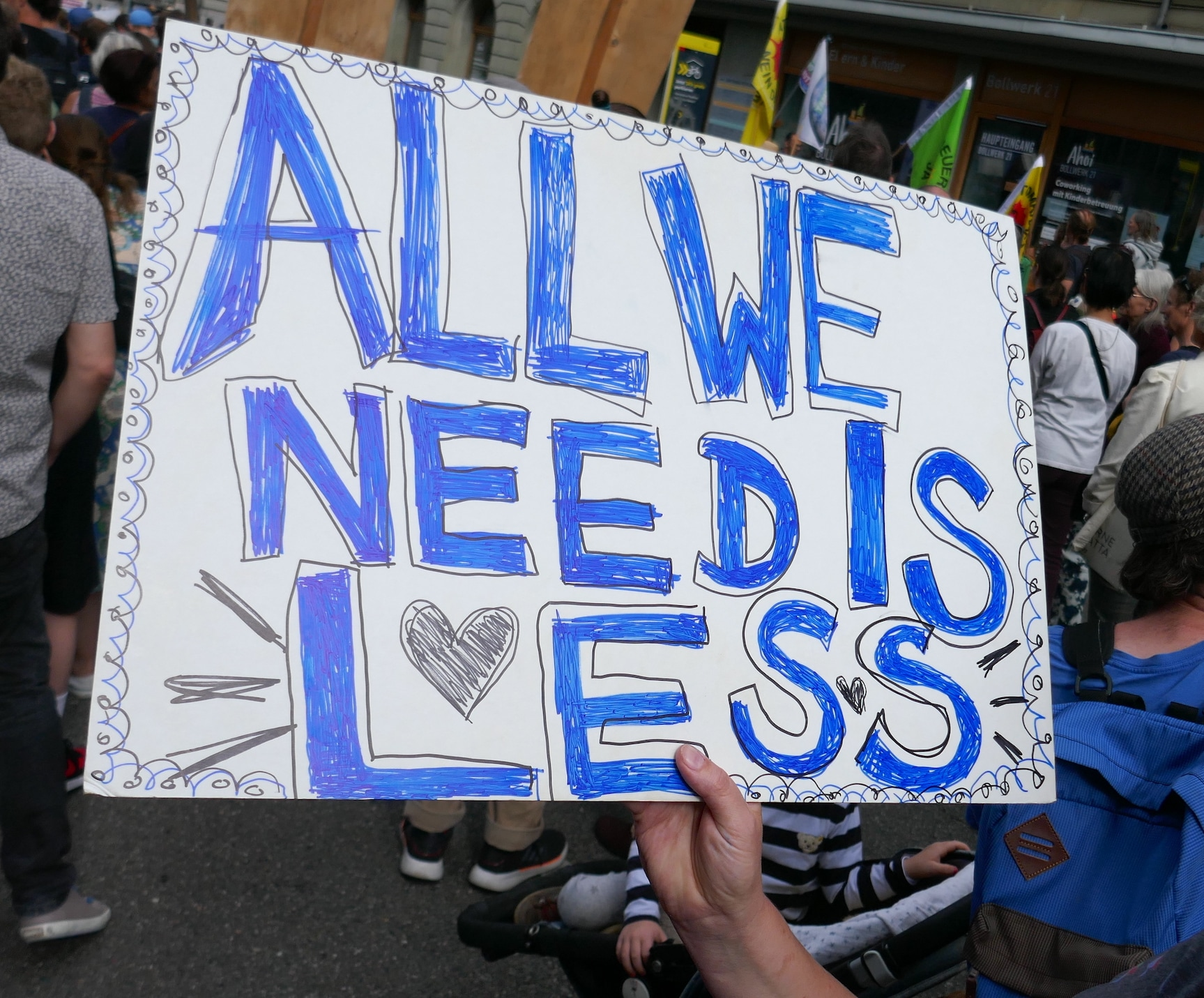
Placard 'All we need is less' at an environmental demonstration (Switzerland, 2023)

=== Influence on other fields ===
The principle has influenced various fields such as fashion, art, music and even the minimalist lifestyle.

=== Criticism ===
Although widely admired, the concept has also been criticized for its sometimes overly rigid approach and lack of warmth or personality in certain designs. Some criticism may also emerge from other minimalist concepts or the overuse of the term 'Less is More.'

== Evolution and modern interpretations ==
=== Modern interpretations ===
Today, the term is often interpreted more broadly to include ideas such as efficiency, clarity in communication and the importance of the essentials in everyday life choices.

=== Evolution and sustainability ===
More recently, the principle of Less is More has been integrated into the concepts of sustainability and eco-design, promoting the use of recycled materials, refillable consumer goods and environmentally-friendly production.

== See also ==
- Degrowth
- Grice's maxims
- KISS principle
- Minimalism
- More is Different
- Minimalism (computing)
- Occam's razor
- Ten Principles for Good design
- Think Different
- Unix
- Worse is better
