= Uni-ball =

Japanese pen and pencil brand

Uniball
- Product type: Ballpoint pens mechanical pencils Marker pens
- Current owner: Mitsubishi Pencil Co., Ltd.
- Country: Japan
- Introduced: 1979; 47 years ago
- Markets: Worldwide
- Registered as a trademark in: United States (Serial #73615530)
- Website: Official website

Uniball (ユニボール, Yunibōru) (stylized as uniball) and Uni (ユニ, Yuni) are brands of pens and pencils, made by the Mitsubishi Pencil Company Limited (三菱鉛筆株式会社, Mitsubishi Enpitsu Kabushiki Gaisha) of Japan. The brand was introduced in 1979 as a rollerball pen model, then expanding to the rest of Mitsubishi Pencil products.

Mitsubishi Pencil Company distributes over 3,000 core products in over 100 countries through subsidiaries, such as Mitsubishi Pencil Company UK. Distribution in the United States, Canada and Mexico is by Uni-ball's North American Corporation in Wheaton, Illinois. In Germany they are sold by Faber-Castell, in the Persian Gulf and the Middle East by Hoshan Pan Gulf, in India by Linc Pen and Plastics Limited (LPPL), and in the Philippines by Lupel Corporation. Despite its naming and the nearly identical logomarks, Mitsubishi Pencil Company is unrelated to the Mitsubishi Group, and has never been a part of their keiretsu. The logo itself is a family crest, or kamon.

== History ==
Mitsubishi Pencil Co., Ltd.

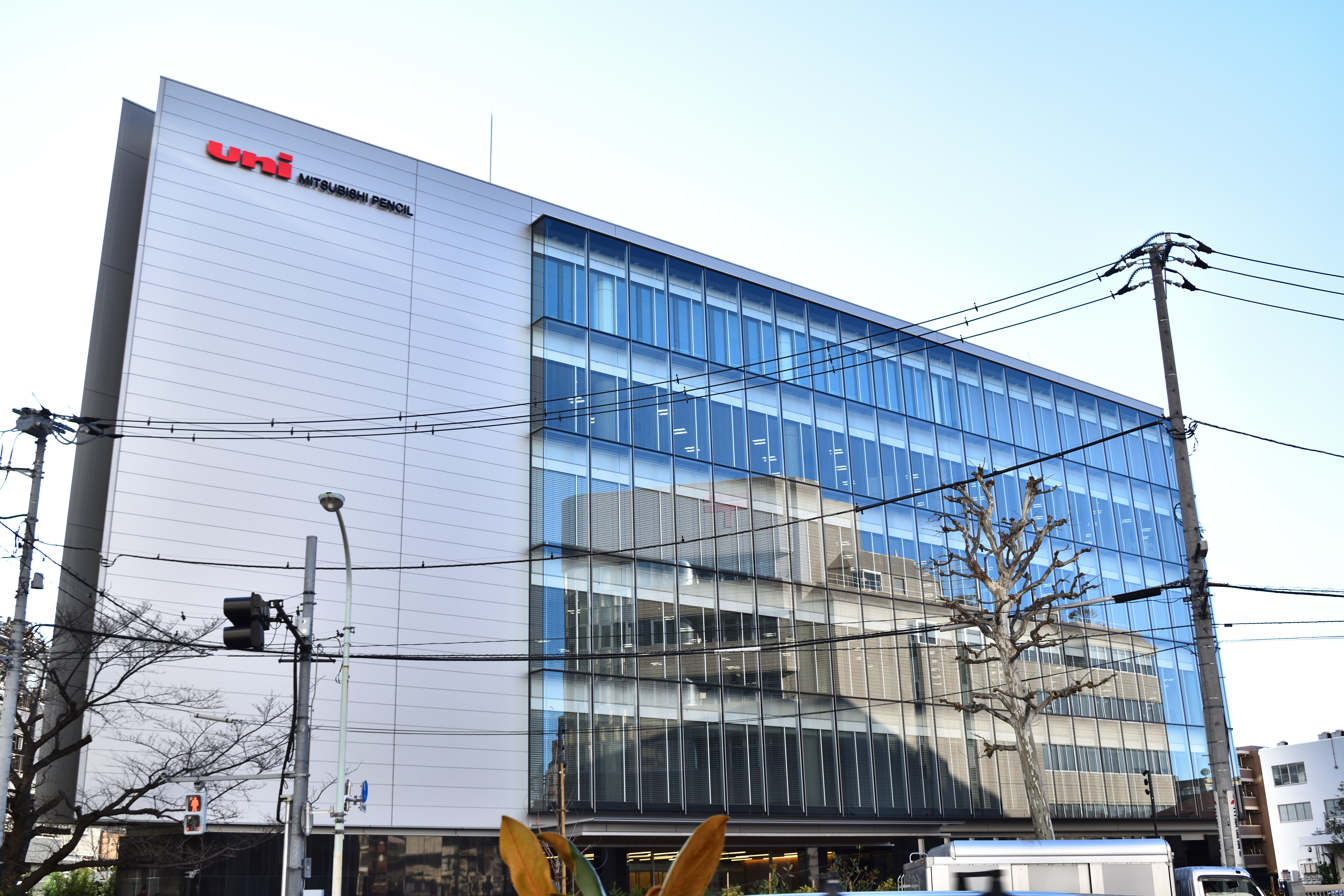
- Mitsubishi Pencil Co. headquarters in Shinagawa, Tokyo
- Native name: 三菱鉛筆株式会社
- Romanized name: Mitsubishi Enpitsu Kabushiki Gaisha
- Formerly: Masaki Pencil Manufacturing Company
- Type: Public KK
- Traded as: TYO: 7976
- Industry: Stationery
- Founded: April 15, 1925; 101 years ago
- Founder: Niroku Masaki
- Headquarters: Higashioi, Tokyo, Japan
- Area served: Worldwide
- Key people: Shigehiko Suhara (President)
- Products: Ballpoint pens mechanical pencils
- Brands: Uniball; Uni; Lamy
- Website: www.mpuni.co.jp

Original Uni-ball logo

The Mitsubishi Pencil company was founded in Tokyo by Niroku Masaki in 1887 as the "Masaki Pencil Manufacturing Company". After World War II, it was renamed "The Mitsubishi Pencil Company".

Masaki Pencil started to export its products, first to Mexico in 1927, then expanding to other markets including Belgium, Egypt, Portugal, Argentina, India and Netherlands. At the end of World War II, the company introduced the "9800" pencil. In 1959, Mitsubishi released its first ballpoint pen, while its first mechanical pencil was launched in 1961.

In 1966, they began creating performance pens and by 1979 they developed the first "uniball" rollerball pen, which was the first ballpen with water-based ink and metallic tip. This pen would be a great success in Japan and North America. One year later, the company launched the "Paint", an oil-based marker.

While mainly focused on making pens, in 2008 they developed a new mechanical pencil that rotated the graphite lead every time it is lifted from the page to sharpen it into an even cone shape. This line of pencils is named as Kuru Toga. The name Kuru Toga is a portmanteau of the two Japanese words 'kuru' (turning) and 'togaru' (to be sharpened).

In August 2020, Uni-ball announced a partnership with Starline. Beginning in January 2021, Starline became the exclusive supplier of the Uni-ball brand for the promotional products industry.

In February 2024, the company announced it was acquiring German fountain and ball point pen company Lamy. The acquisition was completed in the same month.

== Products ==
Although Mitsubishi Pencil started as a wooden pencil manufacturer, the company is no longer specialized in that product, focusing on mechanical pencils instead. Uni-ball's writing implements brands include Jetstream (hybrid-ink ballpoint pens); Air, Eye (marketed as Vision in the United States) rollerball pens, Signo (pigment ink gel pens); Onyx, Kuru Toga (mechanical pencils); Paint, Posca (paint marker pens), Chalk, and Prockey (marker pens).

Wood-cased pencil brands include Hi-Uni, Uni and Mitsu-Bishi. Some other pen lines (mainly intended for the Japanese market) under the Uni brand are Power Tank (pressurised ink-cartridge ballpoint pen), R:E (erasable ink pens), Laknock, Clifter (ballpoints), α(Alpha)-GEL (various types of pens with soft gel-like grips), Style Fit (multi-pen system), Shift, M-552 (mechanical pencils), and Propus (highlighters). Product lines under the Uni-ball brand are One (gel pens), and Zento (rollerball pens).

The brand is often listed best or one of the best pens in gel pen rankings.

=== Pencils ===
Uni

Released in October 1958, it was created to be used for drafting and drawing, and was the pioneer of high quality pencils in Japan.

Hi-uni

Released in 1966, it included all the hardness scales of 9H - 6B stipulated by JIS. The technology was developed to make the particle size very small in Hi-uni pencils. In 2008, 10H and 7B - 10B outside JIS standards were added, resulting in 22 hardness scales. The "Hi-Uni Art Set" with a set of 22 hardnesses is available.

Mitsu-Bishi 9800 series

No. 9800: Released in 1946, for general writing. Available in many grades.

No. 9850: A red-brown pencil with a hexagonal cross section, and attached eraser.

No. 9852: A yellow pencil with a hexagonal cross section, and attached eraser.

=== Mechanical Pencils ===
Uni SHIFT

It is a mechanical pencil ("sharp") used for drafting. The grip is made of aluminum and is knurled.

Kuru Toga

Released in 2008, the Kuru Toga mechanical pencil uses the ‘Kuru Toga engine’, which rotates the lead slightly each time it touches the paper.

In 2017, Uni launched the “Advance,” which doubled the rotation angle of the lead.

In February 2020, the Kuru Toga Dive was released in limited quantities.

=== Ballpoint and rollerball pens ===
Signo

Released in 1994, the Signo is a gel-ink ballpoint pen. In 2015, the "Signo 307" was introduced which used "cellulose nanofiber" ink.

Power Tank

The Power Tank is a pressurized oil-based ballpoint pen. It was introduced in 2001. It can write in conditions where conventional ballpoint pens typically fail, such as when writing upward, on wet paper, or in temperatures below freezing.

Jetstream

The Jetstream line was introduced in 2006. It is a low-viscosity oil-based ballpoint pen.

Uni-ball One

Released in 2020, the Uni-ball One uses a proprietary "BeadsPack" pigment ink in which pigments are firmly enclosed within the particles, reducing absorption into paper fibers. The Uni-ball One series includes three models — Uni-ball One, Uni-ball One F, and Uni-ball One P.

Uni-ball Zento

The Uni-ball Zento is a water-based ink ballpoint pen featuring Uni’s distinctive "Zento Ink," that was introduced in 2025. It uses a polyoxyalkylene (POA) surfactant, along with pigment ink.

There are four models: Basic, Standard, Flow, and Signature.

=== Other writing instruments ===
Uni α(Alpha)Gel

First introduced in 2003, this series uses a shock-absorbing material, called αGEL for the grip. There are models of mechanical pencils, oil-based ballpoint pens, and multi-functional pens.

Style Fit

Style Fit, released in 2009, is a customizable pen system that allows users to combine various body designs with different types of refills.

Posca

Posca (Japanese: ポスカ) (sometimes stylised as POSCA) are Japanese paint markers created by Uni Mitsubishi Pencil in 1983.

Poscas are known for their ability to write on a wide variety of surfaces. They work well on glass, metal, textiles, and stone, but do not work well on acrylic paint or wax crayons. They are more permanent on porous surfaces. Poscas use water-based paints with pigments that is highly opaque, and semi-waterproof when dry.

There are slight variations in colours available between the Japanese and International pens.

Posca pens are popular with graffiti artists and had their origins in graffiti culture. Posca have collaborated with Japanese clothing brand Wasted Youth. The collaboration items were displayed in a pop-up gallery in Miyashita Park. Painter Ken Hamaguchi held an exhibition "Posca: The Opacity of Love 2022" (ポスカ、その愛の不透明度 2022) showcasing Posca artwork.
