= Lamy 2000 =

1966 piston-filled fountain pen by Lamy

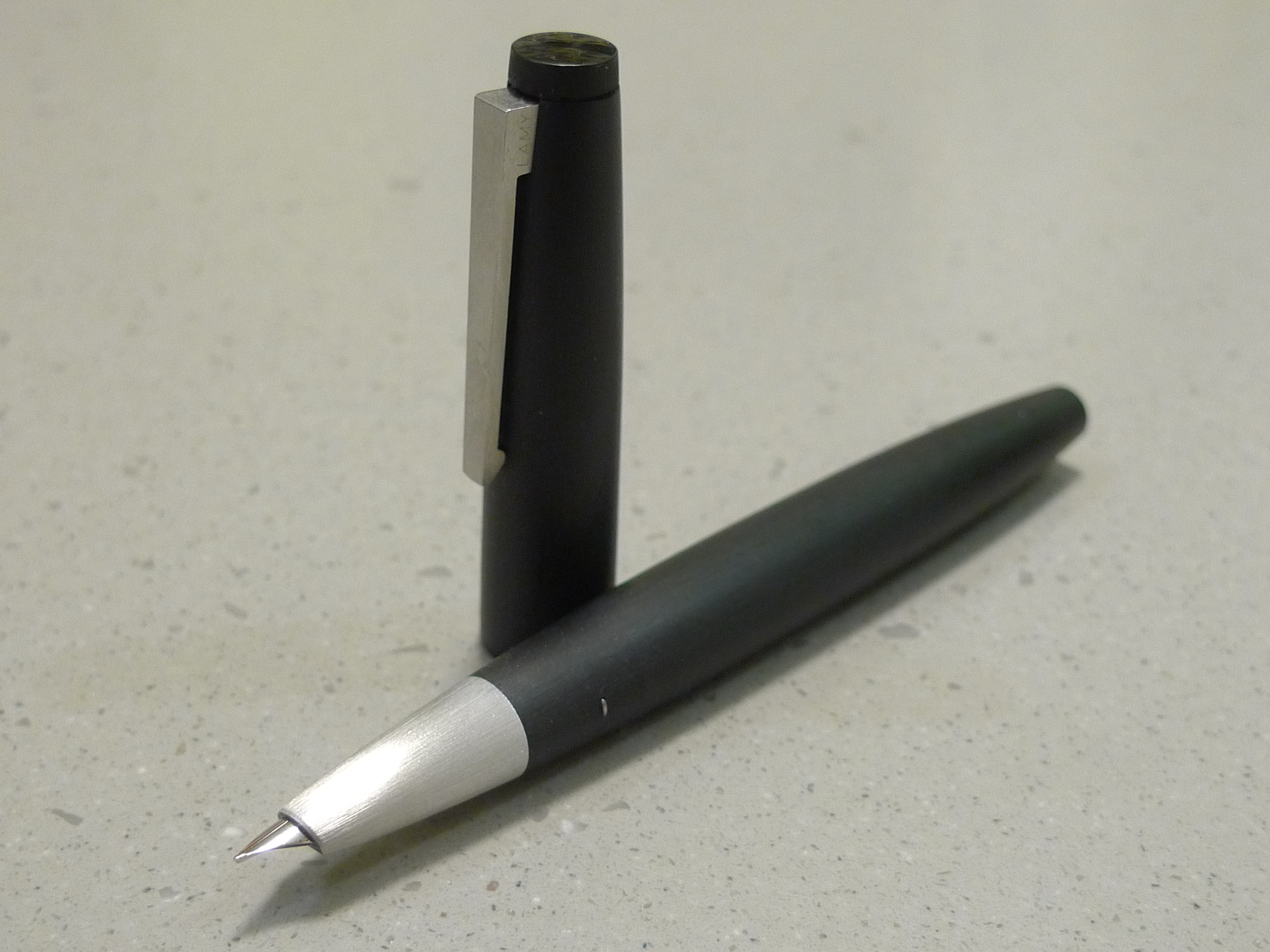
Lamy 2000

The Lamy 2000 is a piston-filled Fountain pen produced by Lamy. It is widely considered to be Lamy's Flagship model.

== History and design ==
The Lamy 2000 was designed by Gerd A. Müller, and subsequently released to the public in 1966. Its semi-hooded nib and material choice was inspired by the Bauhaus movement. The main body consists mainly out of Makrolon, a form of polycarbonate, and a stainless steel grip. An alternate, more expensive stainless steel version is also available as an alternative since 2013. The pen uses a platinum-coated 14-carat gold nib, available in EF, F, M, B, BB, OBB, and OM.

The Lamy 2000 is also offered in various mechanical pencil, and ballpoint variants.

== Special editions ==
The Lamy 2000 has had several Special/Limited Editions produced including, but not limited to:

- LAMY 2000 Pine Green (2024)
- LAMY 2000 Bauhaus Blue (2019)
- LAMY 2000 Brown (2021)
