= Mean Streak =

Mean Streak or Meanstreak may refer to:

== Music ==
- Meanstreak (band), an American thrash metal band
- Mean Streak (album), a 1983 album by Y&T, or its title track
- "Mean Streak" (song), a 1959 single by Cliff Richard and the Drifters
- "Mean Streak", a song by Deep Purple from their 1984 album Perfect Strangers
- "Mean Streak", a song by Gamma from their 1980 album Gamma 2
- "Meanstreak", a song by AC/DC from their 1988 album Blow Up Your Video
- "Meanstreak", a song by Zodiac Mindwarp and the Love Reaction from their 1991 album Hoodlum Thunder

== Other uses ==
- Mean Streak (marker), a marker made by Sanford
- Meanstreak (character), a fictional character created by Marvel Comics
- Meanstreak (DC Comics), a fictional character created by DC Comics
- Mean Streak, a roller coaster formerly located at Cedar Point amusement park in Sandusky, Ohio, U.S., converted and reopened as Steel Vengeance
- Mean Streak, a version of the Kawasaki Vulcan 1600 motorcycle
- "Mean Streak", an episode of the sitcom The King of Queens
