= Copic =

Japanese brand of refillable markers

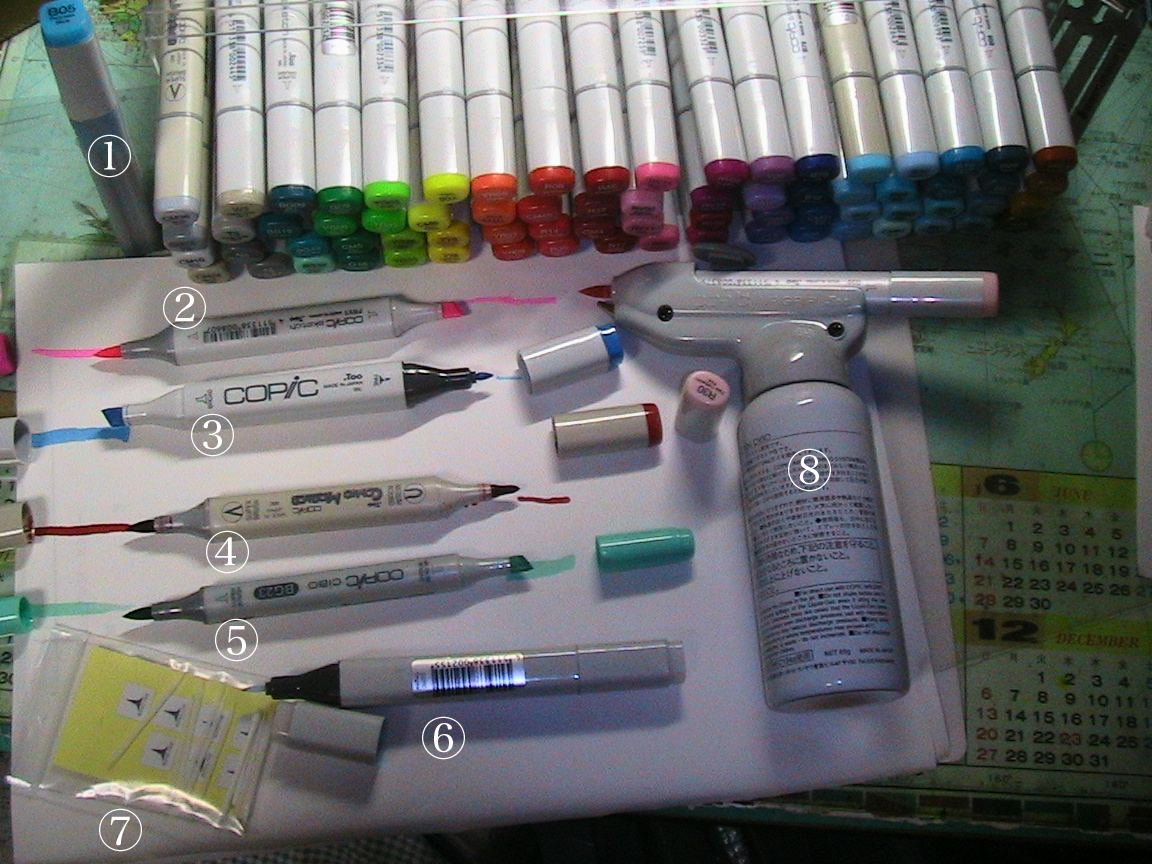
- Copic products, including markers and airbrush
- Product type: Marker pens
- Produced by: Too Corporation
- Country: Japan
- Introduced: 1987; 39 years ago
- Markets: Japan; United States; Australia; Brazil; Canada; Germany; United Kingdom
- Website: copic.jp

Copic (コピック, Kopikku) is a Japanese brand of refillable alcohol markers and related products made by the Too Corporation. They are available in 358 colours with various nib shapes. The refillable ink comes in bottles of 12 ml and 32 ml, and can be used like regular bottled inks. The company also sells empty markers, which can be used to combine inks to create custom colours. The brand is distributed in the United States and Canada by its subsidiary, Too Corporation Americas.
