= Paint marker =

Marker pen filled with or made of paint

A paint marker is a type of marker pen that is used to create permanent writing on a variety of surfaces such as paper, metal, stone, rubber, plastic, and glass. Majik Inki was Japan's first oil-based marker, launched in 1953.

== Ink ==
Unlike with most permanent markers the ink is an oil-based paint and generally requires shaking before use, similar to an aerosol spray paint can. In addition, the line is very opaque and, unlike spirit-based or other permanent inks, will not fade with exposure to UV light, and overlays all other colors beneath it. The paint from these types of markers is not truly permanent, as it can be removed using high pressure cleaning or paint thinning solvents such as acetone.

== Dangers ==
Paint markers, and permanent markers generally, contain the toxic compounds xylene or toluene. Like spray paint, these markers give off volatile organic compounds, which can be dangerous when used in a badly ventilated area or without a particulate mask. Gloves can also be worn to avoid absorption through the skin.

== Solidified paint pens ==
Another type of paint marker is the solidified paint pen. This is a type of marker, often contained within a twist tube, that is a cylinder of semi-hardened oil-paint with a pointed tip. As one writes with it, the point wears down and must be advanced to in order to continue writing. The marker leaves a mark similar to that of chalk. It is useful for marking on wet or oily surfaces. It is sold under the brand name Mean Streak in the United States and generic versions are also available online. It is made by Sanford, the maker of Sharpies, but there are many different brands and types of solidified paint pens.

== Usage ==
Paint pens are used for a variety of purposes. Their most general usage is on windows, and they are often used to advertise sales or discounts meant to bring prospective buyers in. Restaurants often hire a professional artist to "paint" with the markers on their windows. Another popular use is for tire lettering, where auto enthusiasts use the markers to customize the look of their tires.

Paint markers have gained more general usage in the arts and crafts community for a variety of uses. These uses include sign design, on photographs in scrap booking, on clothing, glass home goods, as well as traditional art and street art (mainly graffiti). When deciding what to use paint markers for, an artist should also consider this list of qualities of different paint marker brands: removability, odor, pigmentation, and drying time.
