= Permanent marker =

Type of marker pen

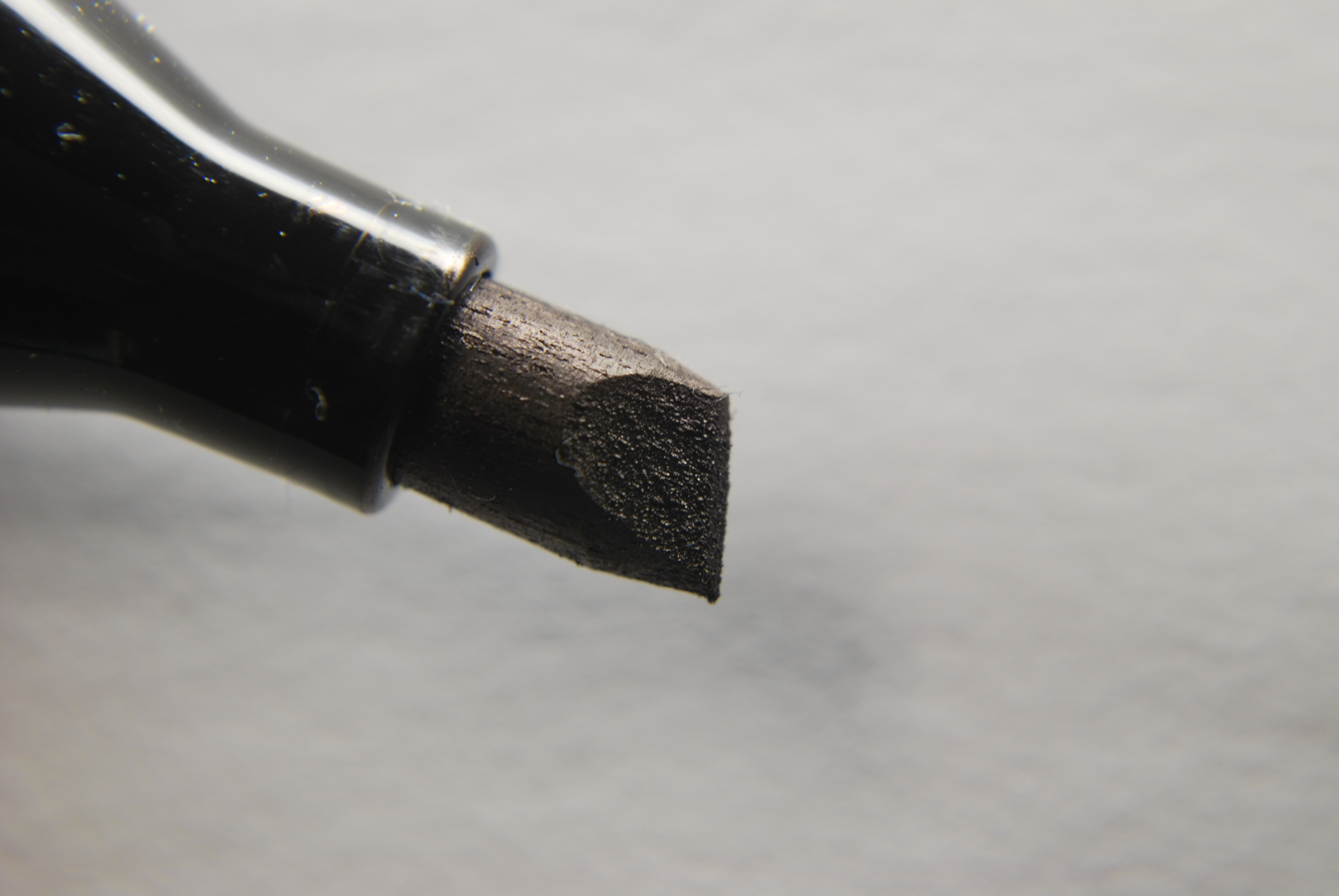
The "chisel tip" of a marker

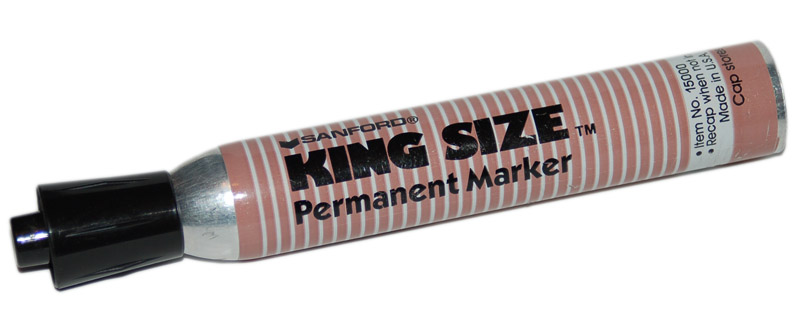
Sanford King Size Permanent Marker

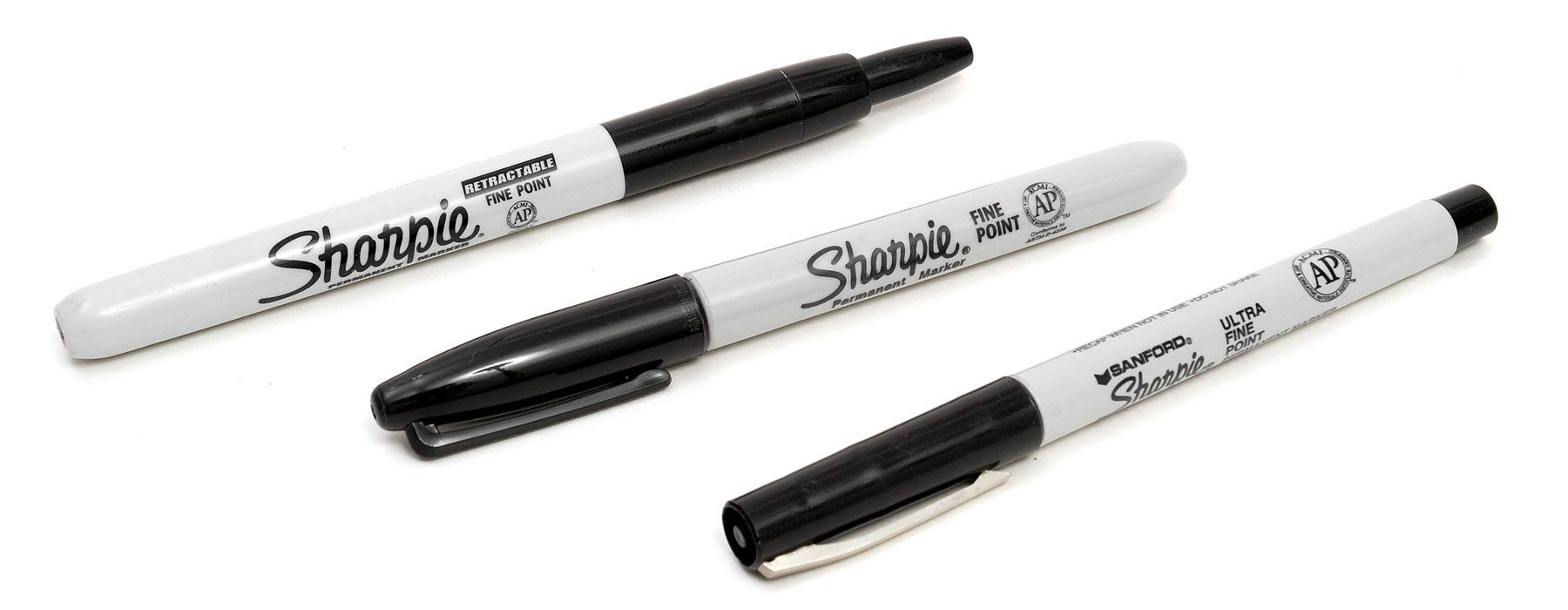
Sharpie brand permanent markers.

A permanent marker or indelible marker is a type of marker pen that is used to create permanent or semi-permanent writing on an object.

== Description ==
In general, permanent marker ink comprises a main carrier solvent, a glyceride, a pyrrolidone, a resin, and a colorant, making it water resistant. It is capable of writing on a variety of surfaces from paper to metal to stone. They come in a variety of tip sizes (ultra fine to wide), shapes (chisel point, bullet tip, and wide bristle), and colors (metallic, or ultraviolet reactive).

Most markers have alcohol-based solvents. Other types, called paint markers, contain volatile organic compounds which evaporate to dry the ink, and are similar to spray paint. Due to solvents such as toluene and xylene often being present in permanent markers, they have a potential for abuse as a recreational drug.

The permanent marker was invented in 1952 by Sidney Rosenthal.

== Applications ==
=== General purpose ===
Permanent markers are used for writing on metals, plastics, ceramics, wood, stone, cardboard etc. However, the mark made by them is semi-permanent on some surfaces. Most permanent marker ink can be erased from some plastic surfaces (like polypropylene and teflon) with little rubbing pressure. They can be used on ordinary paper, but the ink tends to bleed through and become visible on the other side.

=== Use in microscopy ===
In addition to being used for labelling microscopy slides, permanent markers can be used to do a negative stain of a bacterial sample. This means the background is stained with the marker, but the bacteria are not. The bacteria can be seen because they are unstained (lighter) while the background is stained (darker).

== Removal ==
Permanent markers are generally used on hard, non-porous surfaces, because instead of staining they form a surface layer that, despite their name, can be removed by high pressure cleaning, paint thinners, or organic solvents such as acetone, xylene, or toluene. When used indoors, isopropyl alcohol, ethanol, and ethyl acetate are preferred cleaners, as their fumes are much less hazardous than toluene and xylene, the main components of paint thinner, or the longer-chain hydrocarbons found in mineral spirits. Other common non-polar solvents include benzene, turpentine and other terpenes (which constitute essential oils of many plants with strong scents), most ethers, chloroform and dichloromethane, hydrocarbon fuels, and diacetone alcohol, among many others. Many of these solvents are toxic, carcinogenic, or flammable, and should only be used with adequate ventilation.

While these methods work well for non-porous surfaces, removing permanent marker from porous materials like fabric or carpet requires a different approach.

Most brands of "OLFA" marker wipe off easily with acetone-free nail polish remover, the kind containing ethyl acetate, a relatively non-toxic organic solvent.

A permanent marker can also be removed by drawing over it with a dry erase marker on non-porous surfaces such as a whiteboard, as dry erase markers also contain a non-polar solvent. Most dry-erase board cleaner solutions also contain effective organic solvents like 2-butoxyethanol to remove the pigment.

== Laws ==
Due to their potential to be used for vandalism, some locales, such as Florida, California, New York City, and Berwyn, Illinois, have laws against possessing permanent markers in public, and prohibit sales of them to those under the age of 18.

== See also ==
- List of pen types, brands and companies
- Inhalants
