= Lamy =

Manufacturer of pens and pencils

C. Josef Lamy GmbH
- Type: GmbH
- Industry: Writing implements
- Founded: 1930; 96 years ago
- Founder: Josef Lamy
- Headquarters: Heidelberg (Baden-Württemberg), Germany
- Key people: Beate Oblau, Thomas Trapp, Peter Utsch
- Products: Fountain, ballpoint and rollerball pens and mechanical pencils
- Revenue: €78 million (2020)
- Number of employees: 340
- Parent: Mitsubishi Pencil Co., Ltd.
- Website: lamy.com

C. Josef Lamy GmbH (/ˈlɑːmi, ˈlæmi/) is a German pen manufacturing company founded in 1930 by Josef Lamy, a former sales representative for Parker Pen. The company acquired the Orthos pen manufacturer to begin production. Lamy offers a variety of writing products, including fountain pens.

Manfred Lamy, son of Josef Lamy, managed the company until his retirement in 2006. Bernhard M. Rösner then took over as CEO. Lamy's product range includes fountain pens, ballpoint pens, mechanical pencils, and ink.

In February 2024, Lamy was bought by the Japanese Mitsubishi Pencil Company.

== History ==
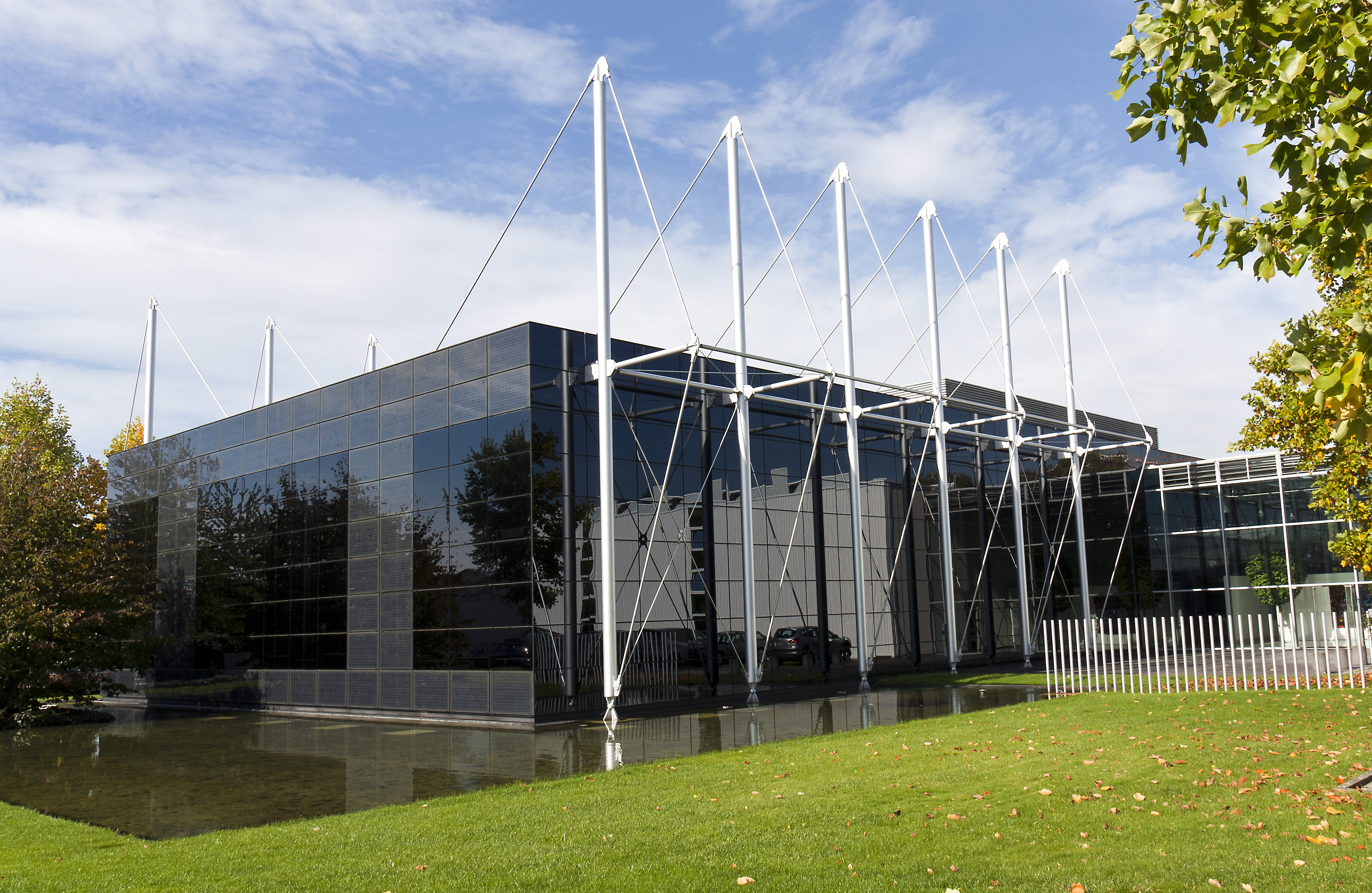
The Lamy Development Centre in Heidelberg, Germany

In 1984, newspapers reported that Lamy's export share increased to 33 percent of turnover. In 1986, Lamy, Montblanc, and Parker held among them 70–80 percent of the West German market. Export markets then consisted of the United States, Japan, and Austria. Lamy hoped to expand that export share to 50 percent of turnover, which stood at approximately 40 million Deutschmark (DM) for 1985. Turnover for Lamy increased to 48 million DM for 1987, then employing 350 people, increasing to 54 million DM in 1988 and a corresponding increase in staff to nearly 400.

In 1989, turnover increased to approximately 62 million DM. Lamy had begun taking on employees as sleeping partners. Approximately one third of the then 400-person workforce became sleeping partners. In that year, Lamy established contacts with East Germany and planned to do business there as well as in West Germany. 1991 held an increase in staff and turnover again, this time to 85 million DM and five hundred staff. Lamy invested in their "innovation workshop" in Heidelberg, in 1996, along with approximate expected turnover being 113 million DM. 1999 showed Lamy reporting stable turnover of approximately 120 million DM, though domestic demand has fallen.

In February 2024, Lamy was bought by the Japanese Mitsubishi Pencil Company.

== Product range ==
The company refers to their products by prefixing "Lamy" in front of the descriptive name, such as "Lamy Scribble" (to avoid repetition, here only the descriptive name is used).

=== Fountain pens ===
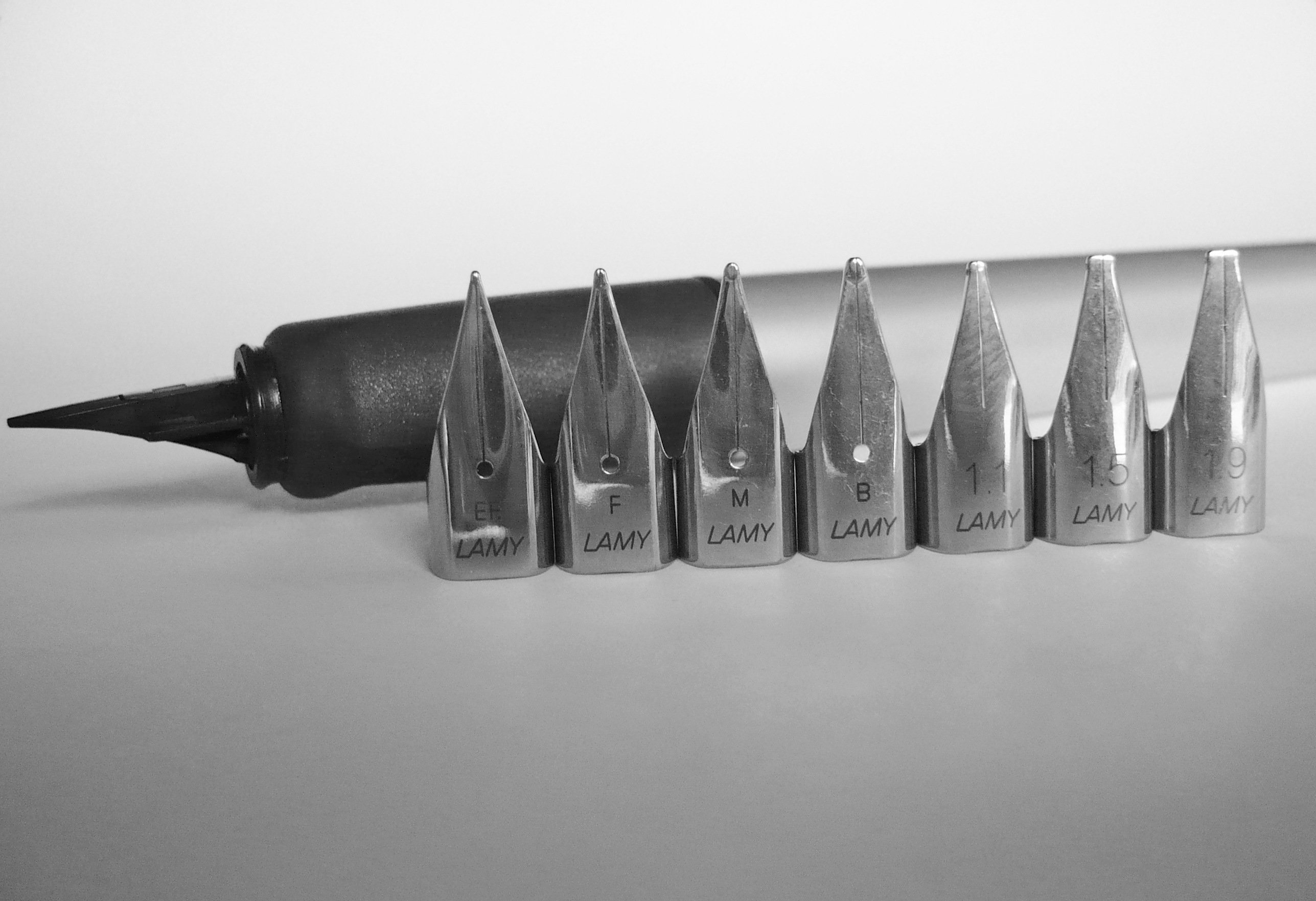
Lamy Z 50 nibs in front of a Lamy Nexx fountain pen

Many Lamy fountain pen models share the same type of feed and nib. Most use Fe-Ni-Cr stainless steel alloy Z 50 nibs which can be interchanged by the user. The feeds are made of ABS plastic and after injection molding are chemically etched with polyethylene glycol (PEG). The etching process causes micro surface scratches by removing styrene from the feed surface and ink channels. This roughening optimizes ink flow characteristics over the feed surface. The 2000 fountain pen model uses gold nibs of another type which are incompatible with Lamy's other fountain pen models.

==== abc ====
Lamy's abc beginner's fountain pen was designed by Bernt Spiegel to be used by children while learning to write. The body is normally made from maple wood and includes a name sticker in the cap to assist in identifying each student's pen. The pen features a non round grip section optimized to be held with a 'tripod pen grip'.

==== Safari, AL-star, LX and Vista ====
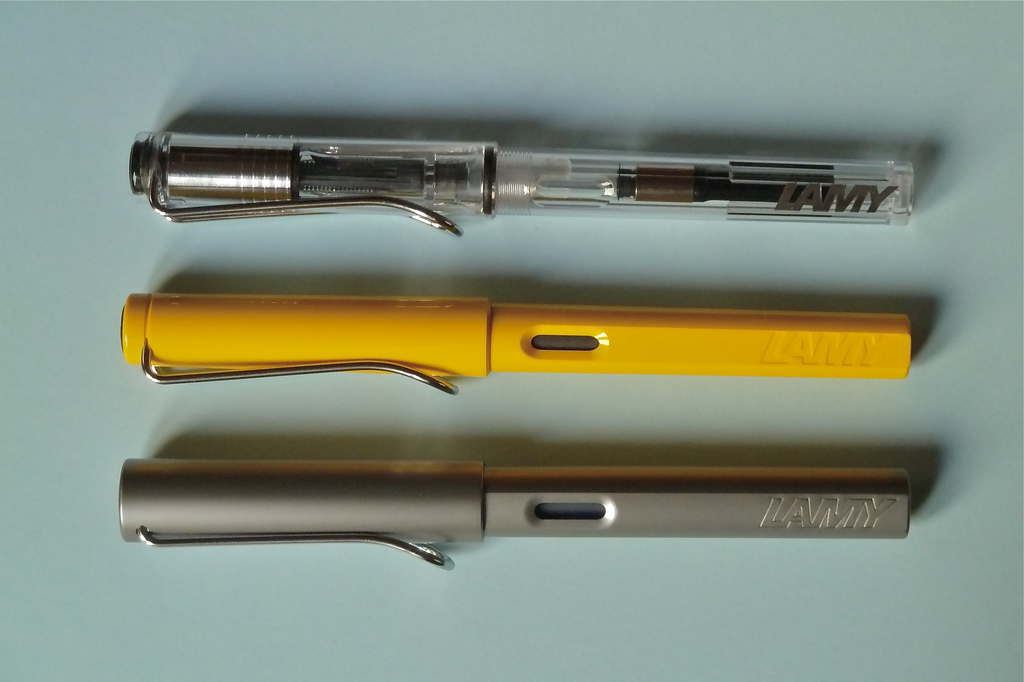
From top to bottom: Lamy Vista, Lamy Safari, and Lamy AL-star graphite

The Lamy Safari was designed by Wolfgang Fabian and Bernt Spiegel of the Entwicklungsgruppe Mannheim which remains in production from 1980. The Safari and the derived AL-star and Vista lines are all cartridge/converter filled and are intended for students and young writers. The pens are made primarily of ABS plastic and like the Lamy abc they all feature a non-rounded grip section optimized to be held with a 'tripod pen grip'. The Vista line is a transparent demonstrator version and the AL-star features an anodized aluminum body and cap with a semi-transparent grip section. In 2016, Lamy released a more expensive variant of their AL-star line called the LX that comes in five colors all named after precious metals, with the exception of the Marron special edition. In addition to the fountain pen, the Safari, AL-star, LX and Vista lines are also available in a ballpoint, rollerball, and mechanical pencil configurations.

==== Dialog ====
The Dialog is a cap-less fountain pen with twist action to expose the 14 carat gold nib. Twisting also causes the pen's clip to retract into the barrel. When closed, a ball valve seals the barrel to protect the nib. The Dialog was designed by Franco Clivio.

==== Accent ====
The Accent is a design from Andreas Haug. The pen comes in a variety of barrel materials and features a grip section that can be swapped for a customized appearance. The Accent's cap has a hinged clip and posts with clicking tabs. The Accent also appears in Lamy's ball-point, rollerball, and mechanical pencil platforms.

==== Studio ====
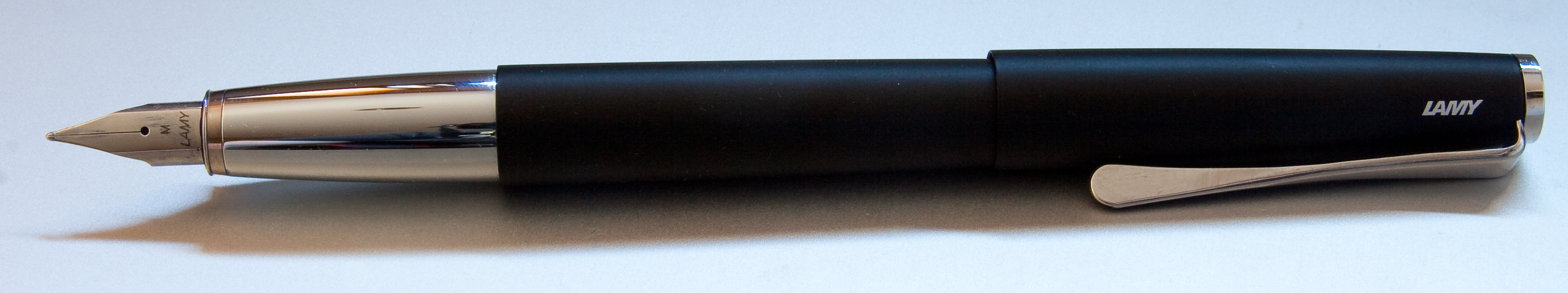
Lamy Studio with black paint surface finish

The Studio is a design by Hannes Wettstein. It is a cartridge/converter premium line model. The metal body and cap are offered in various coloured painted or metal surface finishes. Most versions have chromed round grip sections. The palladium plated version Studio version grip section has a deviating palladium plated grip section. The brushed stainless steel bodied and capped Studio version grip section has a deviating non-slip black grip section. The piano black and palladium Studio versions are more expensive as they feature nibs containing gold. In addition to the fountain pen the Studio line is also available in a ballpoint and rollerball pen configuration.

==== 2000 ====
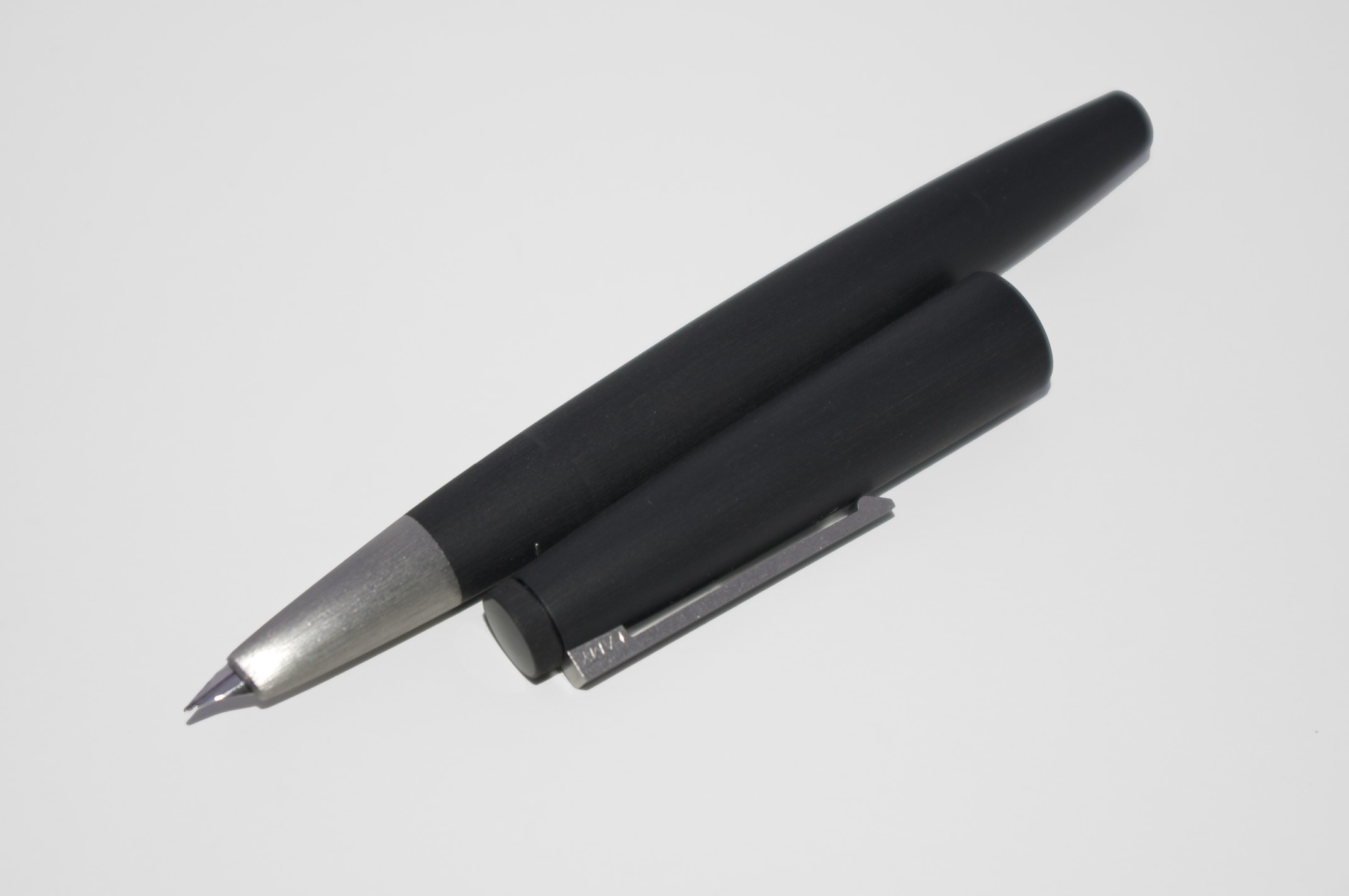
The Lamy 2000

Lamy's flagship fountain pen is the 2000. Designed by Gerd Alfred Müller and released in 1966, it remains in production today. The 2000 uses Makrolon, a polycarbonate resin produced by Bayer that became commercially available in 1958, for the pen body. It is the only current Lamy fountain pen that has a semi-hooded nib and a piston-fill mechanism. The pen has a 1.35 ml ink capacity and only uses bottled ink. In addition to the standard mechanical pencil, ballpoint, and four-color ballpoint versions, a commemorative version called the "Edition 2000" was produced for the new millennium. This version features an inverse design of the original: a stainless steel body with a Makrolon ring and a polished clip.

=== Ballpoints ===
==== Pico ====
The Pico is a pocket telescoping ballpoint pen designed by Franco Clivio. It comes in chrome, red, blue, orange (known as "Flame"), white, and black finishes. Like some other Lamy pens, the Pico features a small protrusion to stop the pen from rolling. Lamy also produces a leather carrying case for this pen. The pen has also won a red dot award for product design

==== Safari ====
After Uniball's acquisition of Lamy, the Lamy Safari series is also equipped with Uniball's Jetstream (a hybrid low viscosity formulation) ink. The pens use a Lamy Jetstream 'M17' refill. The M17 is compatible with the previous M16 refill, which were used in Lamy ballpoint pens. It can be used in existing Lamy ballpoint pens. They are available in two ball diameters: 0.5 mm (EF) and 0.7 mm (F).

=== Rollerballs ===
Other designs such as the Safari and Studio come in rollerball form too, though certain designs such as the Swift are uniquely rollerball pens. The distinguishing design feature of the Swift is the retractable clip. When the point is extended, the Swift's clip retracts to be flush with the body of the pen, which helps the pen sit in the hand more comfortably, and also serves as a preventative reminder not to reinsert the pen into one's pocket with the point extended, which may cause staining.

=== Multisystem pens ===
Lamy produces multisystem pens, which combine a ballpoint and another feature within the one pen, such as the Pickup, which integrates a ballpoint and a highlighter into one body. The highlighter is released from the body of the pen by depressing a button on the body of the pen, and can be reinserted into the body of the pen. The Pickup was also designed by Wolfgang Fabian, and has won the red dot award for product design.

=== Mechanical pencils ===
Lamy produces mechanical pencils. Some of the other Lamy designs exist in mechanical pencil form, such as the 2000 and the Safari. The Scribble, also designed by Hannes Wettstein, is a large-bodied pencil with triangular shapes on the body to help the grip.

==== Safari ====
The LAMY Safari was launched on the market in the 1980s and fascinated people with its avant-garde design. Initially, these writing tools were supposed to be used by students, but they became appreciated by users of all ages. This line exhibits high-quality pencils made of durable ABS plastic. They have a slim silhouette, provide an ergonomic grip, and come in a variety of vibrant colors. This brand has an eraser under the cap. Underneath the cap, it contains a cleaning needle for graphite jams. Both the eraser and the pin are replaceable. The drawing instrument accepts leads of 0.5 mm and features a chrome spring clip.

==== 2000 ====
The LAMY 2000 is identical in its form with this brand's fountain pen. It features the same elegant and classic design and has a black matte finish and a high-quality writing mechanism. The pencil is made of fiberglass and stainless steel, which makes it light and well balanced. The writing tool is developed with a conical and retractable tip and has a texturized grip made of Macrolon resin. Under the top of the push button, there is a replaceable eraser. The interior container holds a thin needle for cleaning graphite jams. The pencil has a rounded clip and comes in two lead sizes – 0.7 and 0.5 mm.

==== Scribble ====
The Lamy Scribble has a plastic matte black barrel that ensures a convenient grip. The body of this pencil is lightweight and well-balanced. It uses 0.7 mm lead. The drawing instrument features a cap which indicates the lead size on its top. Underneath the cap, it has an integrated eraser and a needle for cleaning graphite jams. Its point has a chrome conical shape and contains a retractable tip. The LAMY Scribble has a chrome clip that can be removed if necessary. This writing tool is great for sketching and note-taking and can be used by students, designers and architects.

=== Ink ===
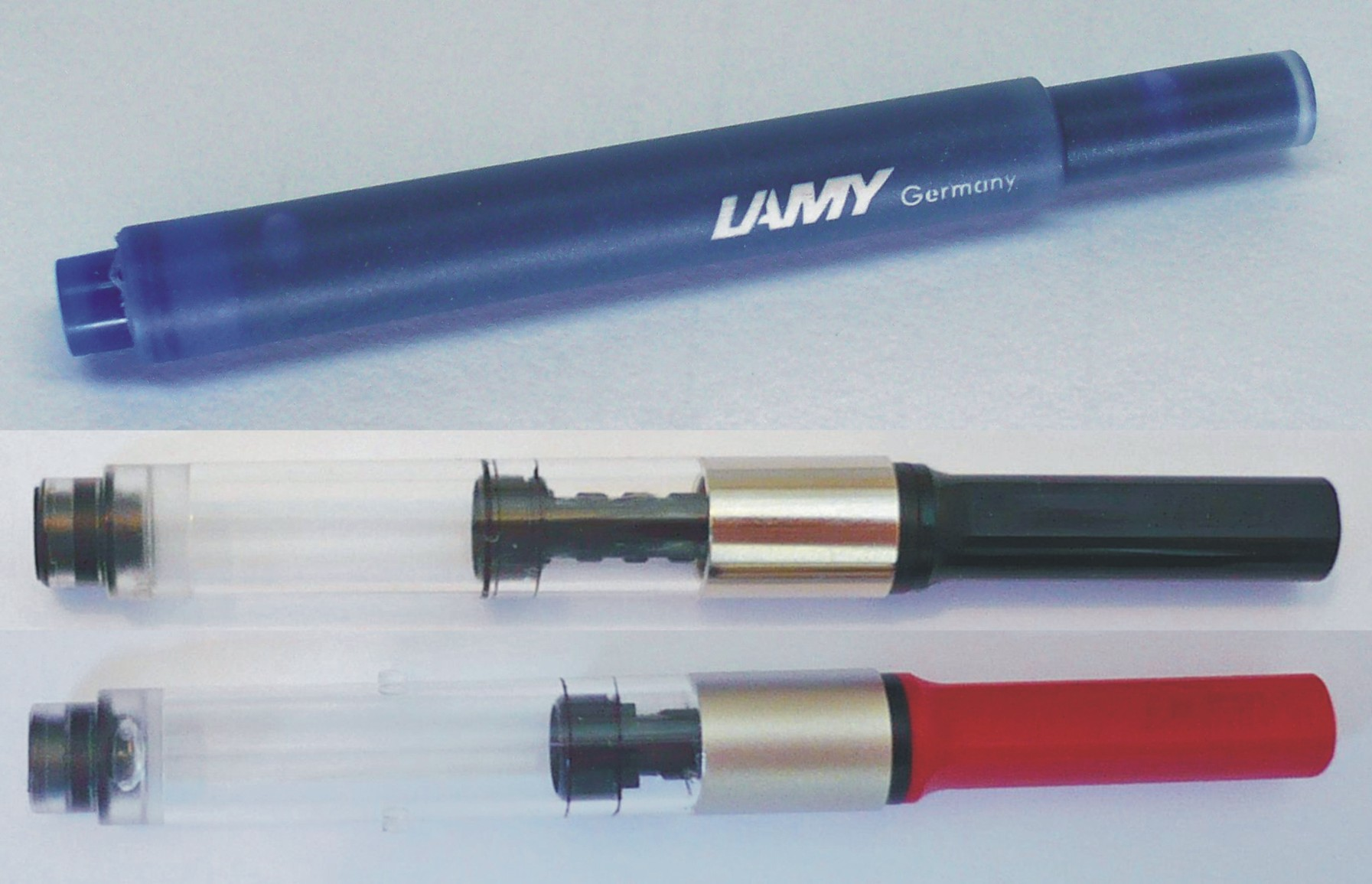
Top to bottom: blue Lamy T 10 proprietary ink cartridge and Z 27 and Z 28 ink converters

Lamy produces fountain pen ink in bottles and proprietary ink cartridges. Lamy provide the widest range of colours in what it designates as T10 cartridges, with black, blue, blue-black, red, green, turquoise and violet. The T10 cartridge has approximately 1.15 ml ink capacity.

For using bottled fountain pen ink Lamy offers several proprietary piston operated converters. The ABC, AL-star, Joy, Nexx, Nexx M, Safari and Vista fountain pens can be fitted with the proprietary Z 27 or Z 28 converter that has approximately 0.7 ml ink capacity. The converters for the school/young writing line of fountain pens feature two protrusions that form fit into two arresting recesses in the grip sections of these pens. The Accent, Aion, CP 1, Dialog 3, Imporium, Linea, Logo, ST and Studio fountain pens can be fitted with the proprietary Z 27 converter for the premium line of fountain pens that has approximately 0.7 ml ink capacity.

=== Ink erasers ===
Lamy also makes double-ended pens that allow one to edit what they have written in ink before. One end is a white nib with a fluid that makes ink 'disappear', the other end has a nib that writes in blue ink which is not affected by the ink eraser so that one can write on top of what was just erased. However, after this is done, one can not rub it out again.

=== Earlier designs ===
Earlier Lamy designs includes the Lady and the Persona; "vintage" designs are varied but have numerical suffixes instead of descriptive names. The Lady was a design intended to appeal to women; the Lady is manufactured out of painted, hardened, porcelain and does not feature a clip as it was thought that women do not normally make use of the clip—a small protrusion prevents the pen from rolling on a flat surface. The Lady was designed by Wolfgang Fabian and Sharon Jodjaja was responsible for the barrel designs.

== Gallery ==
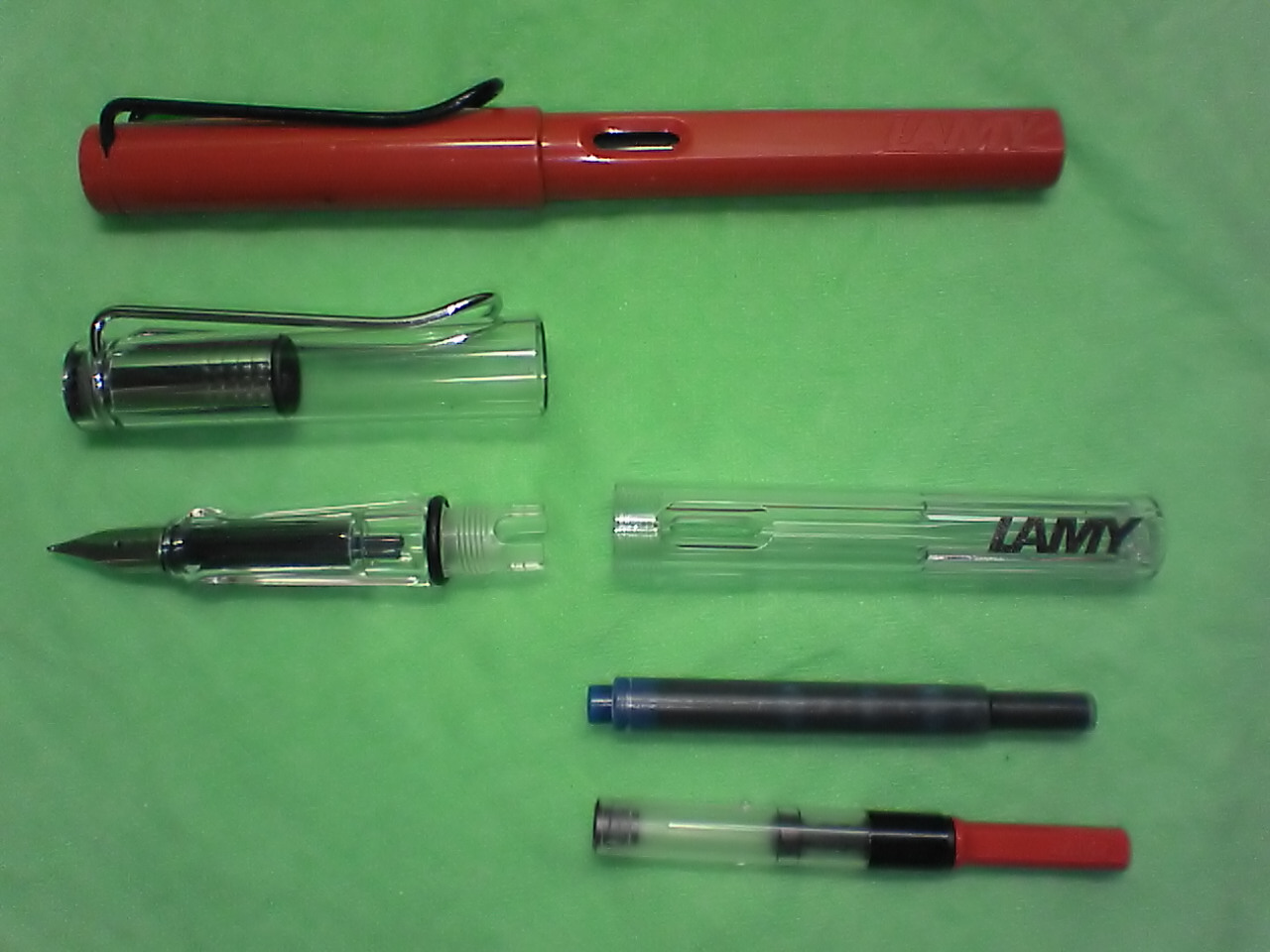
Lamy Safari (top) in red and Vista (bottom) fountain pens. Under the Lamy Vista transparent demonstrator pen a Lamy T10 ink cartridge and a Lamy Z 24 piston operated converter for using bottled fountain pen ink.

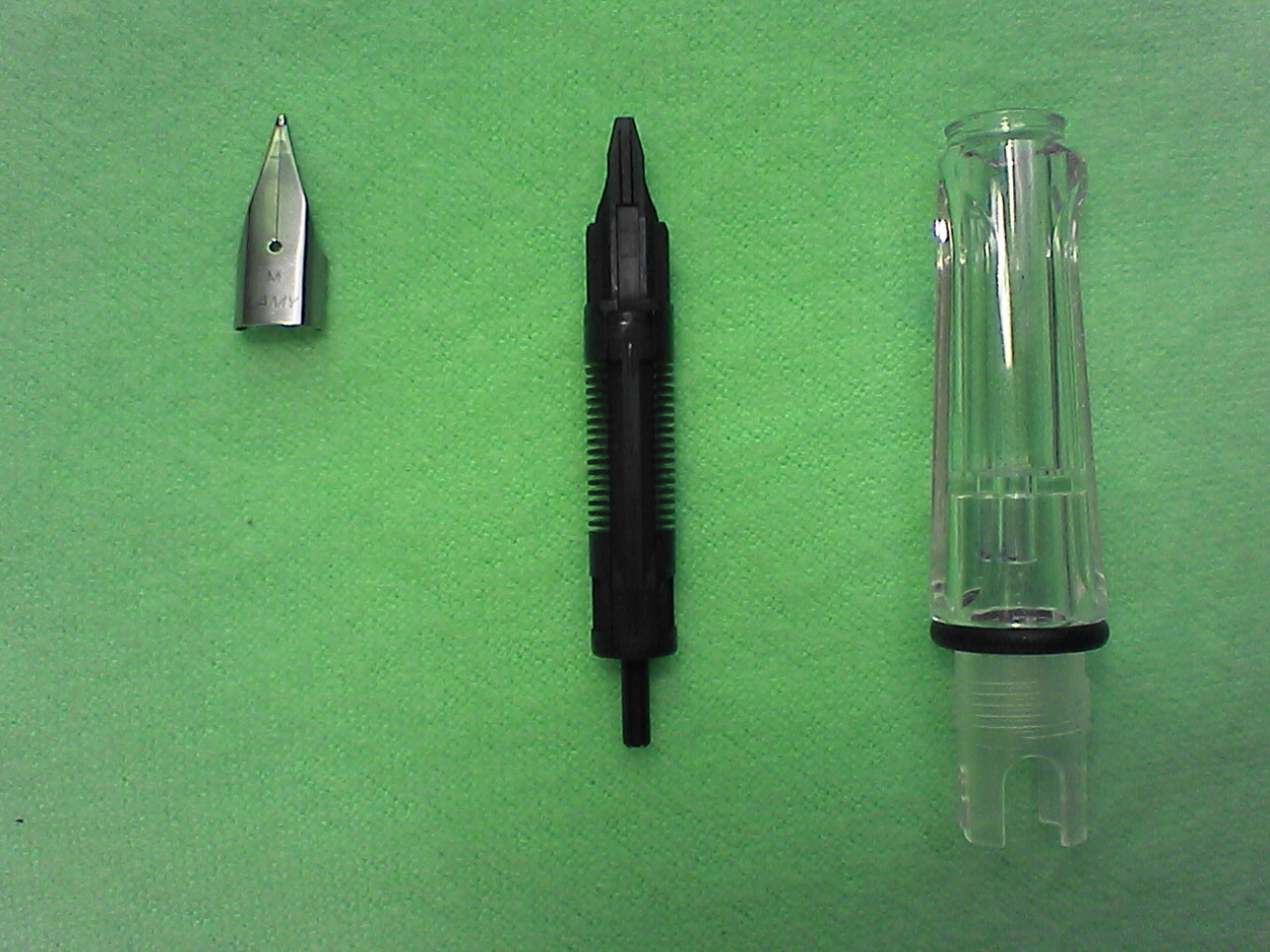
Parts of a Lamy Vista fountain pen. From left to right: Z 50 M nib (medium line width), ink feed, grip section of the barrel.

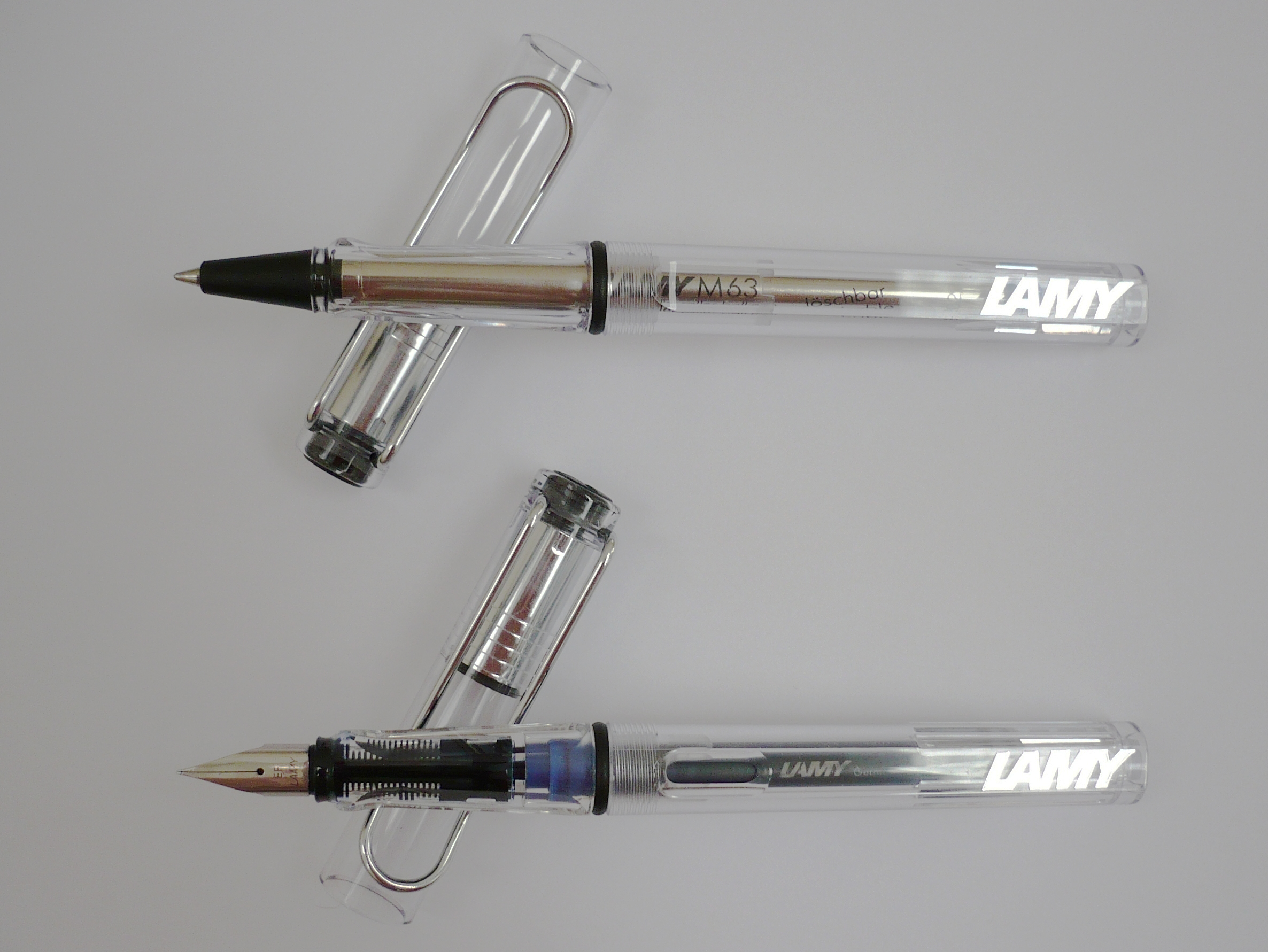
Lamy Vista rollerball pen (top) and Lamy Vista fountain pen

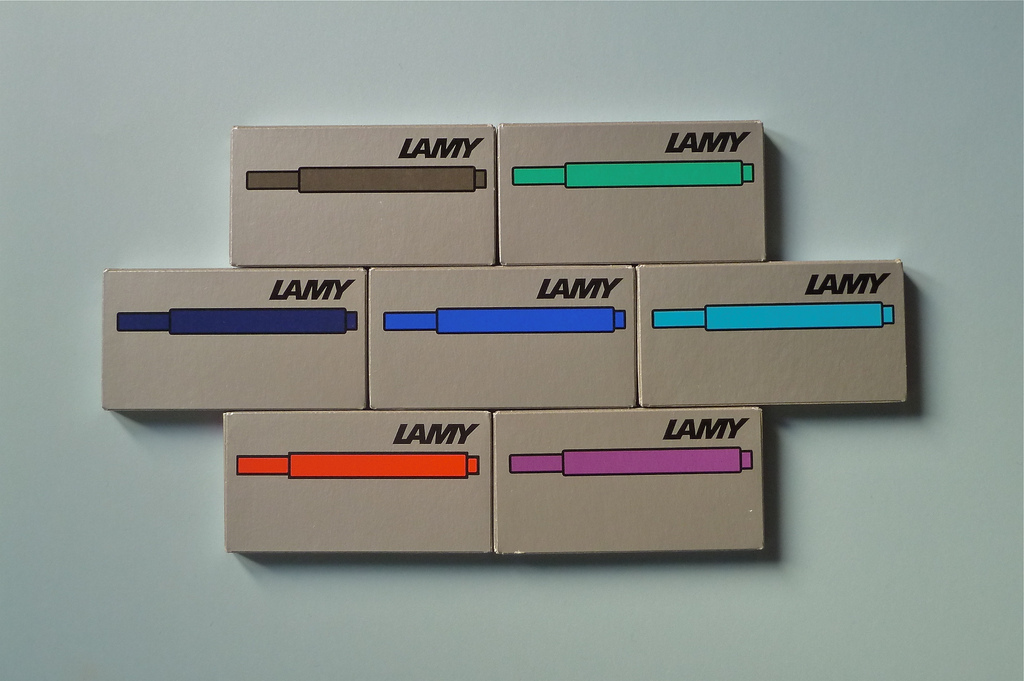
Boxes of Lamy fountain ink cartridges

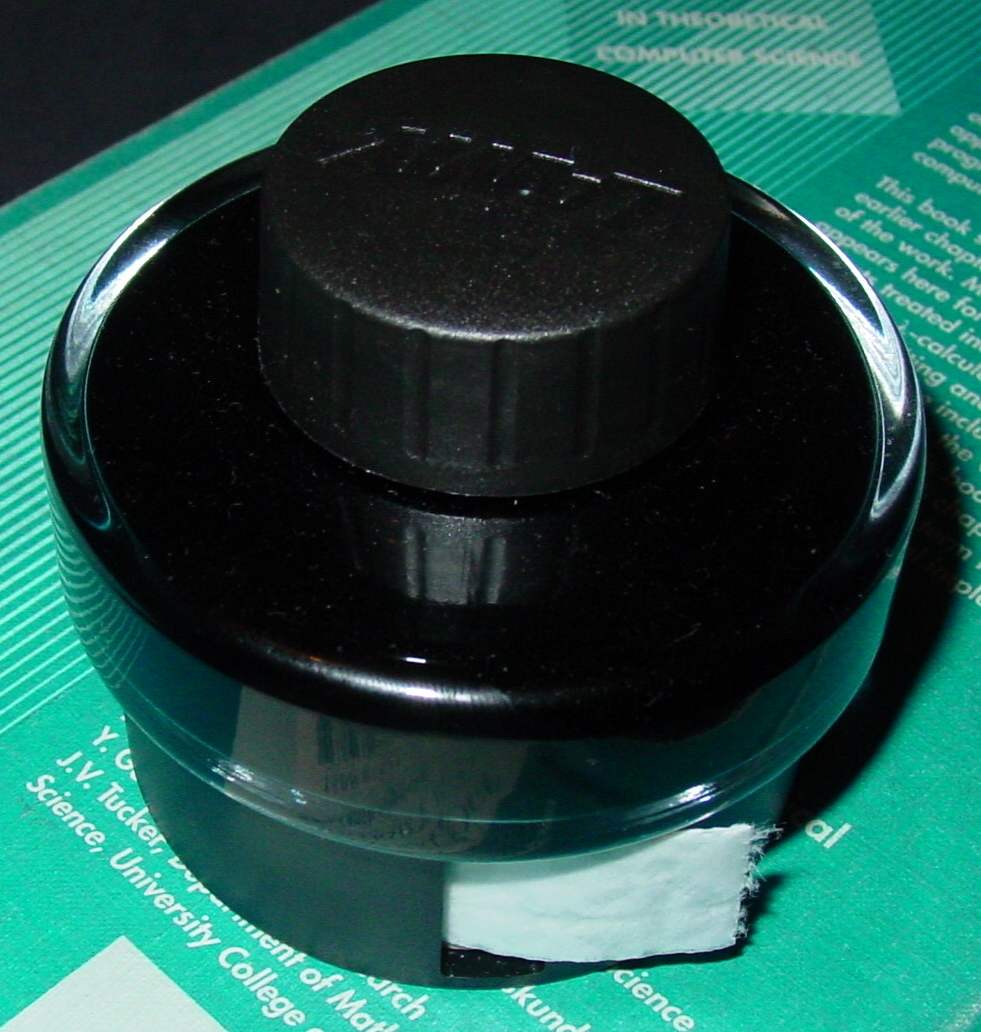
Lamy T 52 bottled black fountain ink

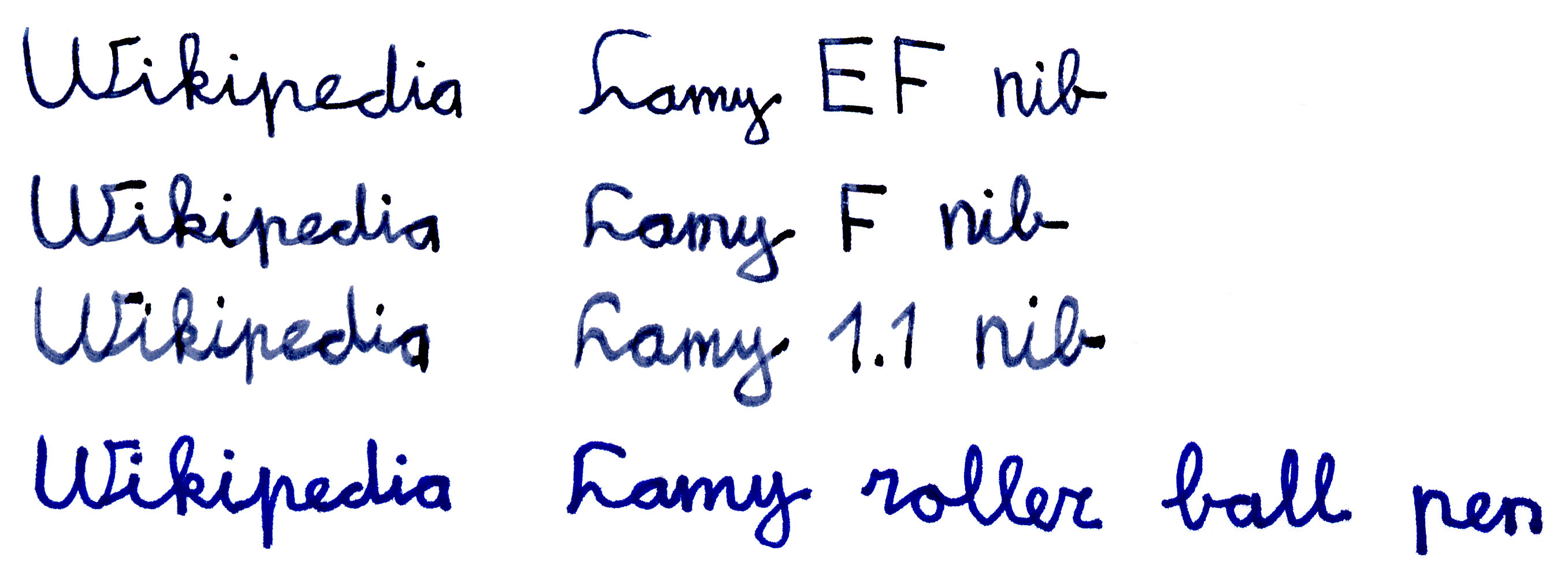
Lamy fountain pen and rollerball pen writing samples
