= Gerd A. Müller =

German industrial designer

Gerd Alfred Müller (1932 in Frankfurt am Main — December 6, 1991) was a German industrial designer. Müller's notable works include products for Braun and Lamy, Including Lamy's flagship product, the Lamy 2000.

== Career ==
In 1952, Müller began attending the Werkkunstschule Wiesbaden.

In 1955, he started working at Braun, where he worked for 5 years before departing in 1960. In his time with Braun, Müller developed various appliances including razors, record players, and kitchen appliances. Some of his notable designs for Braun include the KM 3 kitchen machine, the SM 3 razor, and the PC 3 record player (with Dieter Rams and Wilhelm Wagenfeld).

After his departure from Braun in 1960, Müller began working as a freelance industrial and graphic designer. In this time, he would design many writing instruments for Lamy. This includes their now flagship pen, the Lamy 2000, which he designed in 1966. He also developed the CP1, Twin, ST, and Unic models for Lamy.

Notable Designs of Gerd A. Müller

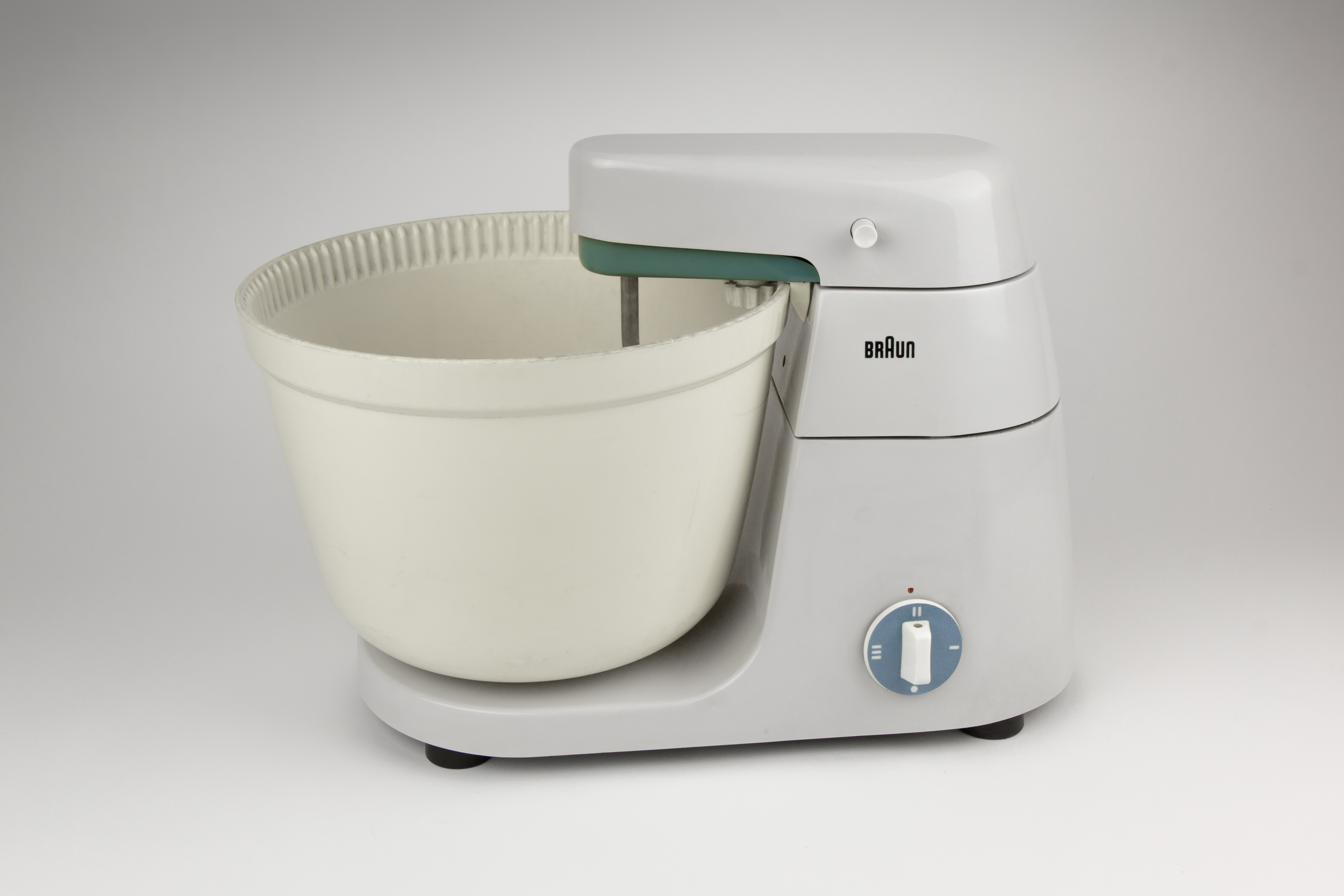
Braun KM 3

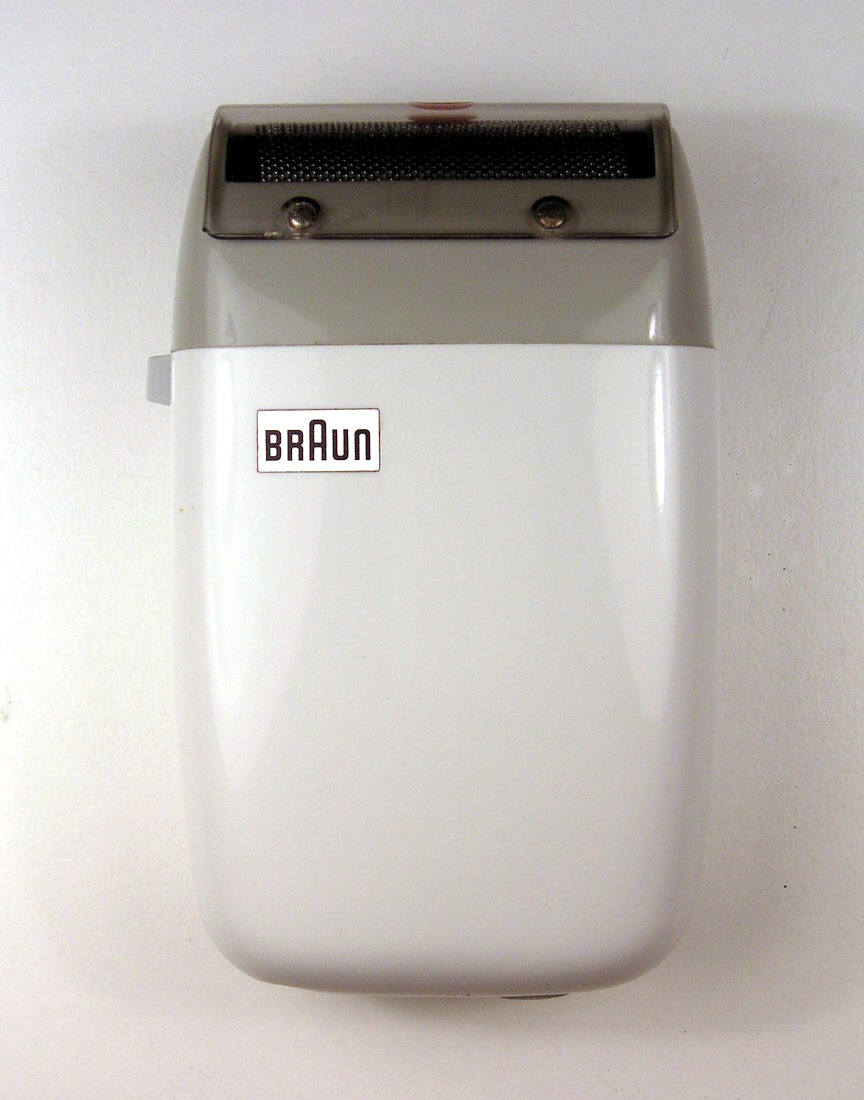
Braun SM 3

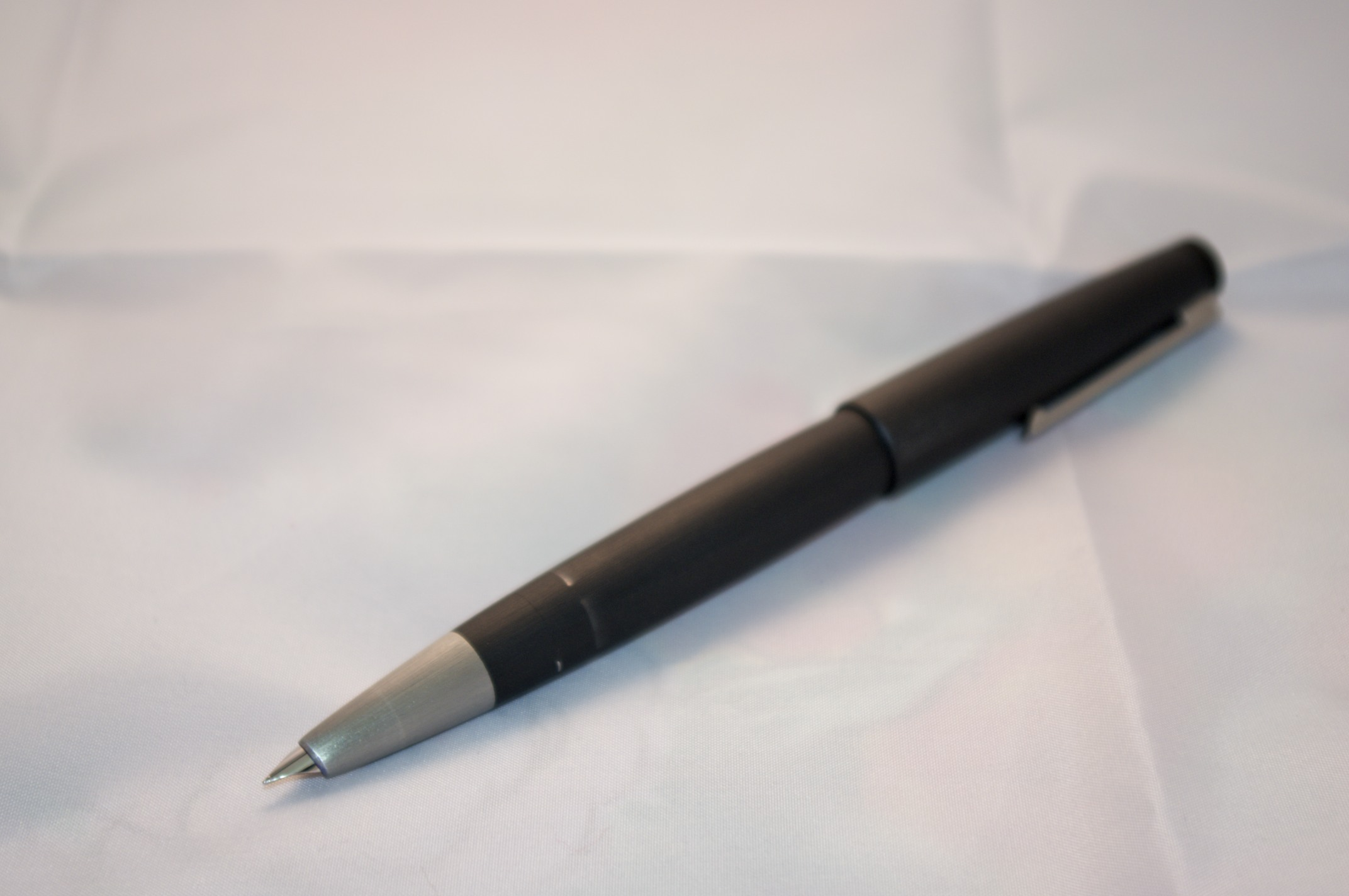
Lamy 2000

== Awards ==
Industrie Forum Design Award for:

- 1977 – Lamy Cp1
- 1978 – Lamy 2000
- 1982 – Lamy Marker Texto
- 1985 – Lamy Unic
- 1989 – Lamy Twin
