= Sidney Rosenthal =

Sidney Rosenthal (1907–1979), from Richmond Hill, New York, is credited with inventing what is now known as a Magic Marker in 1953.
