= Wet-wipe marker =

Writing implement

Wet-wipe markers or wet-erase markers are a type of writing implement, which are used primarily on overhead transparencies, tablets at restaurants, and office calendars. Other uses include writing on mirrors, chalkboards, plastics, ceramics, glass windows and other non-porous surfaces. The contents of these markers are water, resin, and titanium dioxide.

== Uses ==
The markers are similar to other products such as dry erase markers, in both their uses and applications, and also in that they come in an assortment of colors. They differ, however, in their use of a quick drying liquid paste as their medium. By using a paste instead of an alcohol base, the marking is semi-permanent, and will not be wiped away by a whiteboard eraser. Additionally, the paste is less likely to cause allergic reaction than dry-erase alcohol or chalk dust. Marks can then be cleaned off non-porous surfaces with a damp cloth.

Because of their semi-permanent nature, wet wipe markers are often used to draw a template, especially in school classrooms or on calendars (to mark the boxes). Dry erase markers can usually be applied on top of the wet wipe marker, and erased without touching the wet wipe marks.

Wet wipe markers were often used on overhead projector transparencies, as they could be stored and transported easily, unlike a traditional chalkboard. With the rise of computerized slide-shows (e.g. PowerPoint) in the classroom and office, overhead usage has reduced substantially, and with it, the wet wipe marker.

== See also ==
- List of pen types, brands and companies
