= Mean Streak (marker) =

The Mean Streak is a type of marker made by Sanford, but can also refer to a variety of solidified paint marking sticks. This marker is a semi-solidified stick of oil-based paint in a twist tube which makes marks on many types of surfaces, including metal, wood, plastics, and paper, making it a popular graffiti instrument. It leaves a mark similar to a crayon or chalk. They come in a variety of colors; the original colors were blue, red and yellow.

== See also ==
- Oil stick
