= List of terms about pen and ink =

This list of terms about pen and ink is an alphabetic list of terminology about ink pens and ink. Some of the terms might not be very notable outside this list.

== A ==
- Alizarine ink

== B ==
- Ballpoint pen – an ink pen which uses a roller ball tip
- Ballpoint pen artwork
- Bic Cristal – a brand of inexpensive, disposable ink pen
- Birmingham pen trade – commerce of ink pens in Birmingham, England
- Birmingham Pen Trade Heritage Association
- Biro – a type of ink pen, also known as a ballpoint pen
- Blacklight paint – a type of ink which glows under a black light

== C ==
- C. Howard Hunt – an American company that manufactured dip pens; defunct; its pens are now commercialized under the "Speedball" brand
- Classmate Stationery – an Indian brand of student stationery products
- Compatible ink - for use in printers
- Conductive ink - results in a printed object which conducts electricity

== D ==
- D. Leonardt & Co. – a manufacturer of pens; founded in 1856, it is one of the oldest manufacturers of dip pens
- Demonstrator pen – a pen which is transparent, so its inner mechanism can be seen
- Dip pen – a type of nib pen with no ink reservoir
- Drop out ink

== E ==
- Election ink – a type of ink applied to the finger of a voter, to prevent election fraud
- Erasermate – a brand of erasable pen, manufactured by Papermate
- Erythrosine – a type of ink and food dye
- Esterbrook – a brand of ink and fountain pens

== F ==
- Flex nibs – pen nibs which use pressure to vary line width
- Flo-Master – a brand of inks and markers in the latter half of the 20th century
- Fountain pen – a nib pen which contains a reservoir of ink
- Fountain pen inks

== G ==
- Gel pen – any pen using a water-based liquid or gelled ink

== I ==
- India ink – a type of ink
- Ink – a substance used to stain or dye
- Ink blotter – a pad used to absorb excess ink
- Inkpot – a low-lying bottle used to hold ink
- Inkwell – a low-lying bottle used to hold ink
- Iron gall ink – a purple-black or brown-black ink made from iron salts and tannic acids

== J ==
- Joseph Gillott's – a manufacturer of ink pens
- Jotter – a type of ballpoint pen

== L ==
- Lithol Rubine BK – a type of ink and food dye

== M ==
- Marker pen – an ink pen used to make wider marks
- Montblanc – manufacturer of ink pens
- Mr. Sketch – a brand of scented marker pens

== N ==
- Nib – the part of a pen which contacts a surface to deposit ink

- Nibmeister – a person who repairs fountain pens or grinds nibs

== P ==
- Paint marker – a type of pen using oil-based paint
- Parker – a manufacturer of luxury pens
- Pelikan - a German, Swiss-incorporated manufacturer of fountain pens and other writing, office and art equipment
- Pen – an instrument for writing
- Pen Room – a museum in Birmingham, England about the pen trade
- PenAgain – a pen used to reduce repetitive strain injury
- Permanent marker
- Perry & Co. – a manufacturer of ink pens
- Plastisol – a type of ink
- Porous point pen – pen with a point of porous material such as felt or ceramic

== Q ==
- Quill – an ink pen made from a bird feather
- Quink – a fountain pen ink developed by the Parker Pen Company

== R ==
- Rastrum – a five-pointed instrument used to draw parallel lines, sometimes assembled out of ink pens
- Retipping – replacing or restoring the tip of an ink pen
- Rollerball pen – pen using water-based gelled ink (rather than oil)
- Ruling pen – a pen used to denote ruler lines

== S ==
- Sheaffer – a manufacturer of writing implements, primarily luxury pens, founded in 1913
  - Sheaffer Prelude – a line of writing instruments made by the Sheaffer Pen Company
- Skin pens – a type of pen applied to skin by doctors or tattoo artists, to create a temporary image
- Solid ink – a type of ink for use in printers
- Soy ink – made from soybeans and more environmentally friendly than some other inks
- Space Pen – a pen which uses pressurized ink cartridges and is able to write in zero gravity
- Speedball – a manufacturer of pens and other art materials
- Stark's ink – a homemade ink in the 19th century

== T ==
- Tattoo – a nearly permanent pattern drawn on skin
- Technical pen – a pen used to make consistent lines in architectural or technical drawings
- Thermochromism – a process of coloring by using heat

== U ==
- uni-ball – a brand of ink pen made by the Mitsubishi Pencil Company
- UV marker – a pen whose marks can be seen only under an ultraviolet light

== W ==
- Walnut ink – a type of ink made from walnuts' husks

== See also ==
- List of pen types, brands and companies
- List of stationery topics
