= List of pen types, brands and companies =

A pen is a handheld device used to apply ink to a surface, usually paper, for writing or drawing. Additional types of specialized pens are used in specific types of applications and environments such as in artwork, electronics, digital scanning and spaceflight, and computing.

The following is a list of pen types, brands and/or manufacturing companies of those writing implements. Related items are listed as well.

Types of pens

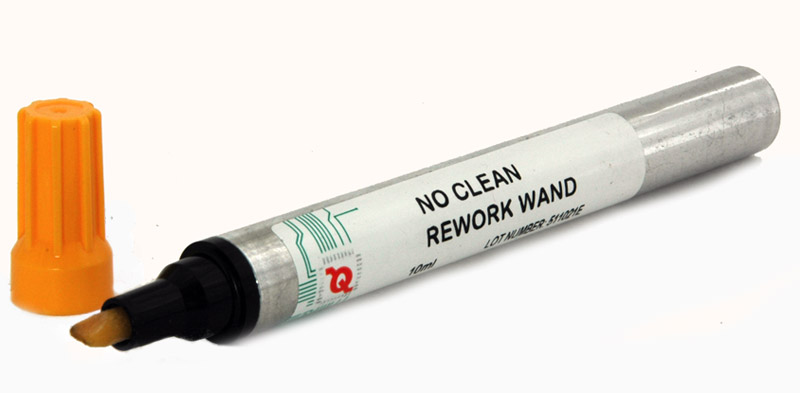
Flux pen used for reworks

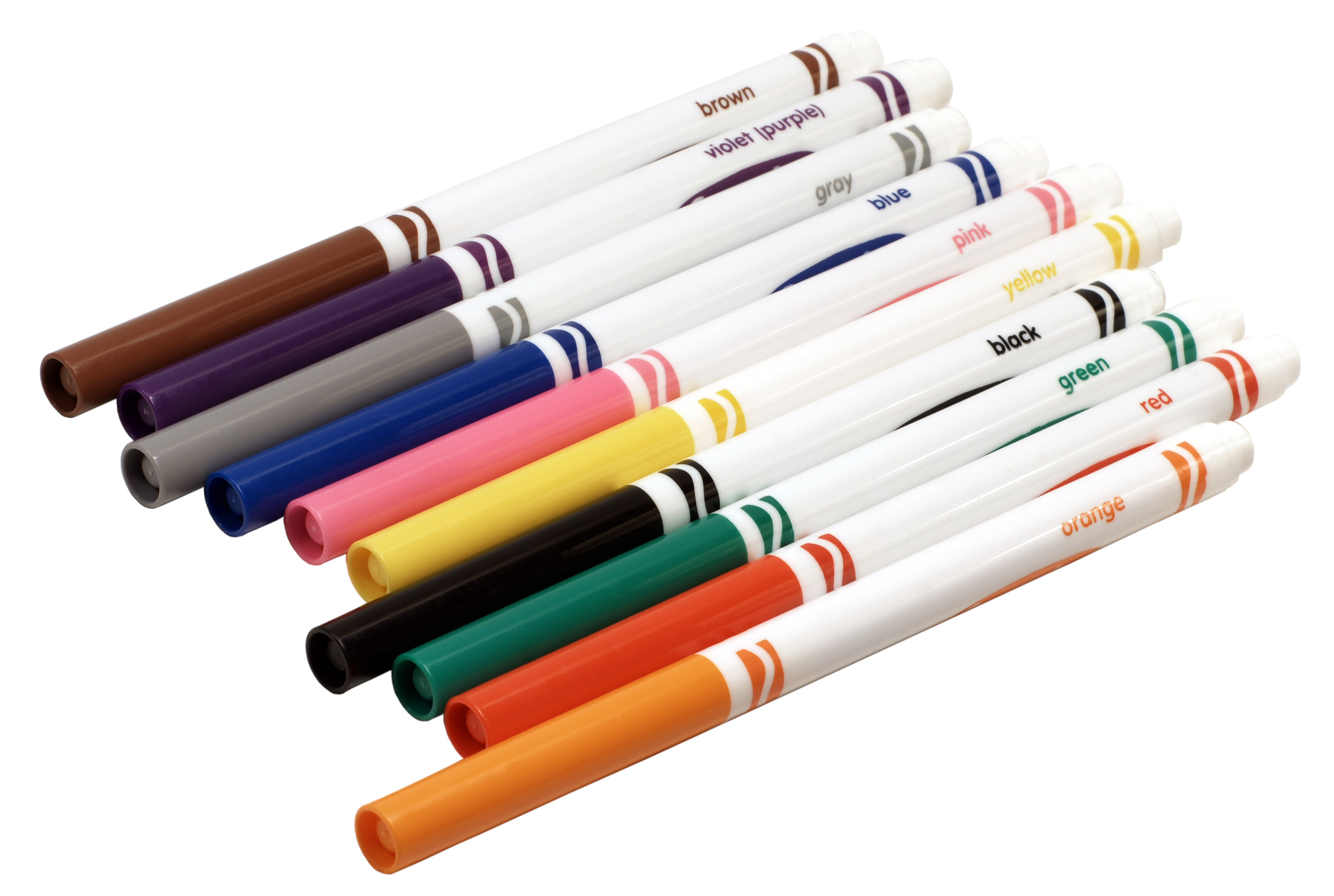
Crayola markers

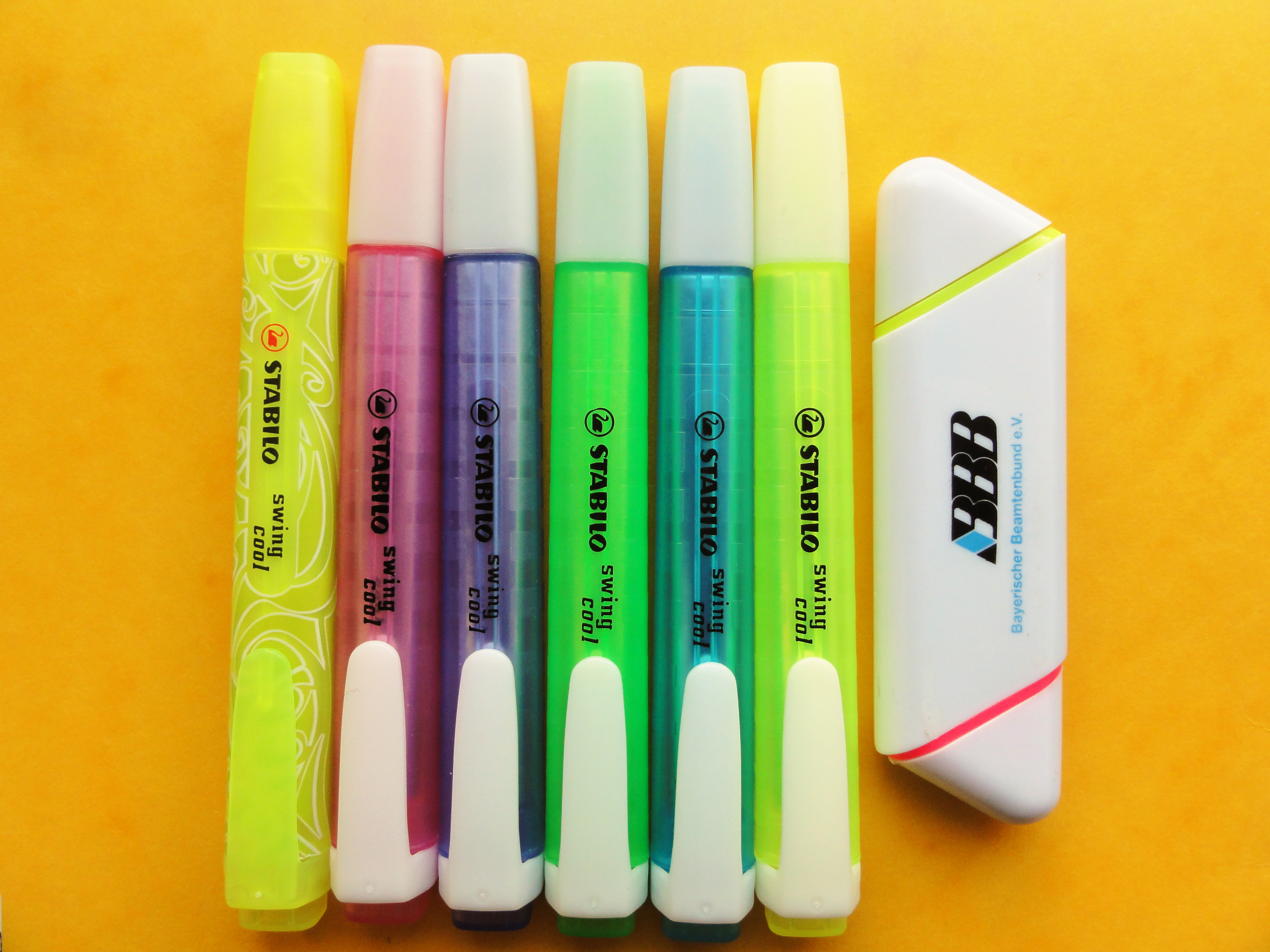
Highlighters

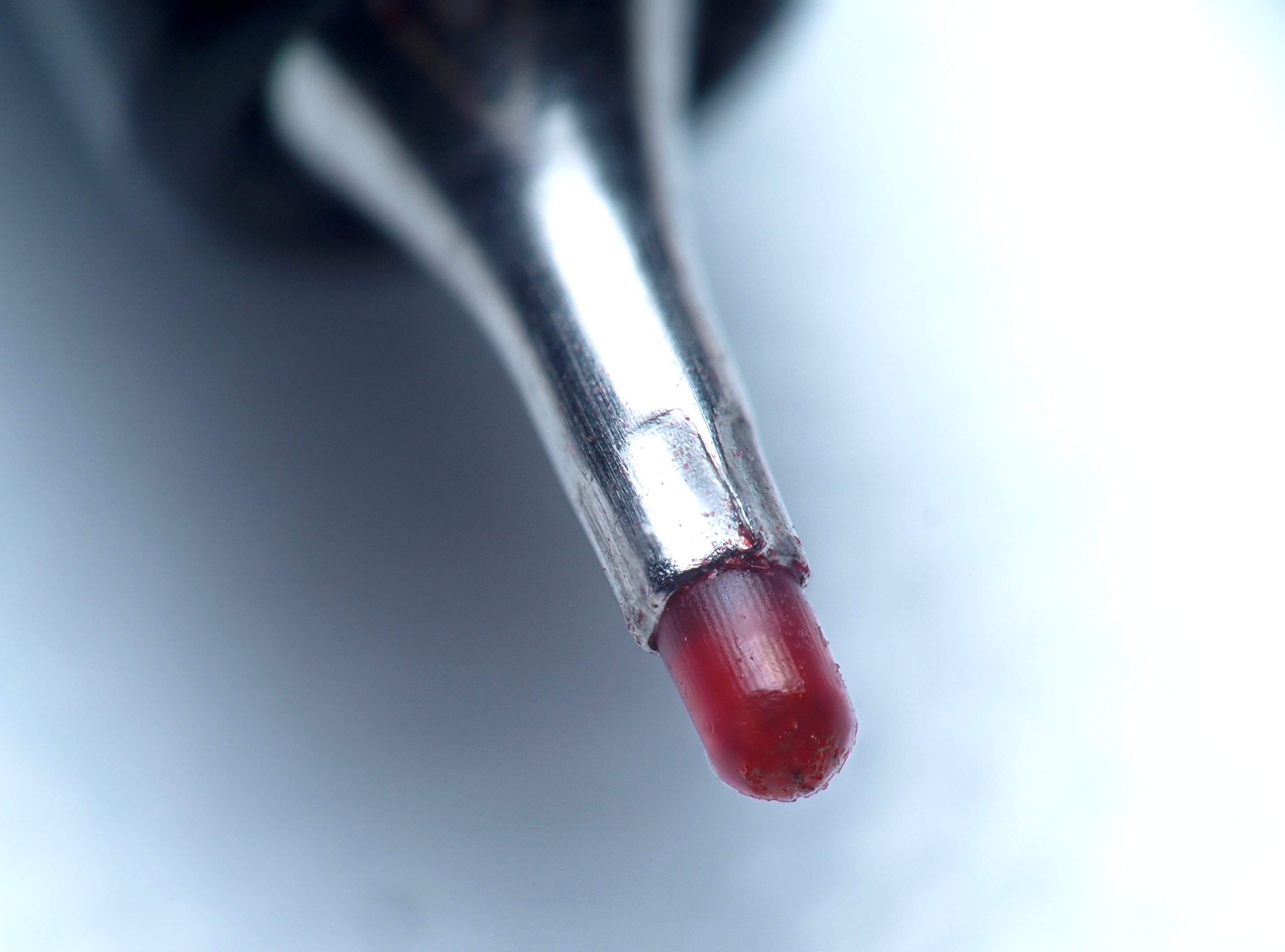
Tip of a fine point marker

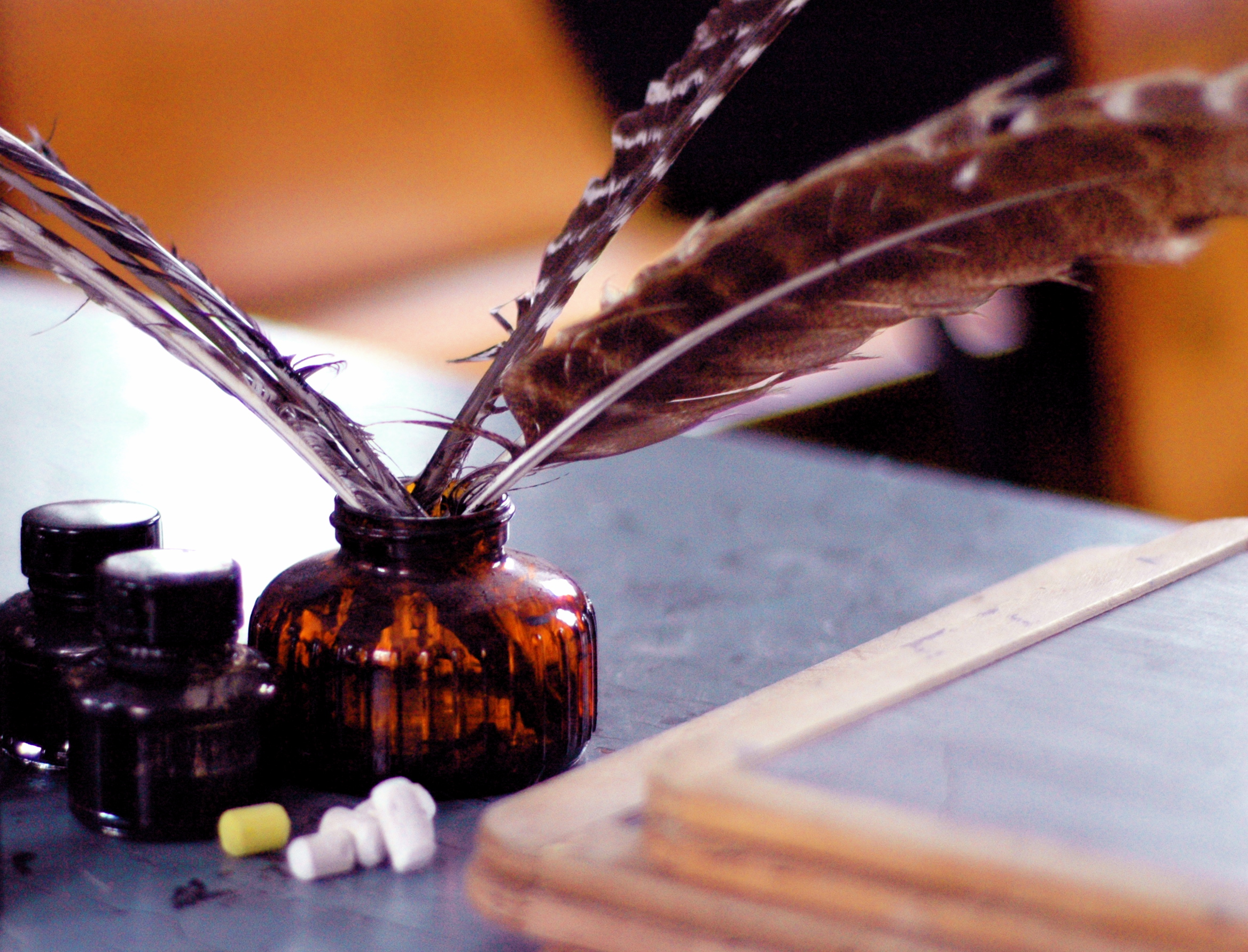
Quill pens and inks

== Types ==
- Active
- Ballpoint
- Counter
- Counterfeit banknote detection
- Decoder
- Demonstrator
- Digital
- Dip
- Flex nibs
- Flux
- Fountain
- Fudepen (or "brush pen")
- Gel
- Marker pen, also known as a felt-tip pen
  - Highlighter
  - Mean Streak
  - Paint
  - Permanent
- Quill
- Rastrum
- Reed pen
  - Kalamos
  - Qalam
- Rollerball
- Ruling
- Skin pens
- Space Pen
- Technical pen
- Stylus (computing)

== Inventors ==
- László Bíró (improvements ballpoint)
- Alfred Dunhill (improvements fountain pen)
- George Safford Parker (improvements fountain pen)
- Petrache Poenaru (improvements fountain pen)
- Walter A. Sheaffer (improvements fountain pen)
- Lewis Waterman (improvements fountain pen)
- Sidney Rosenthal (improvements markerpen - Magic Markers)

== Brands ==
Brands and products

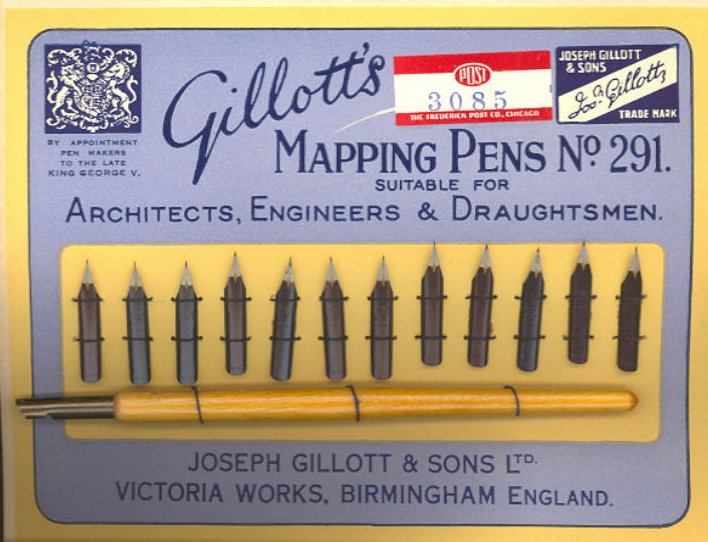
Gillot 291 pens and holder

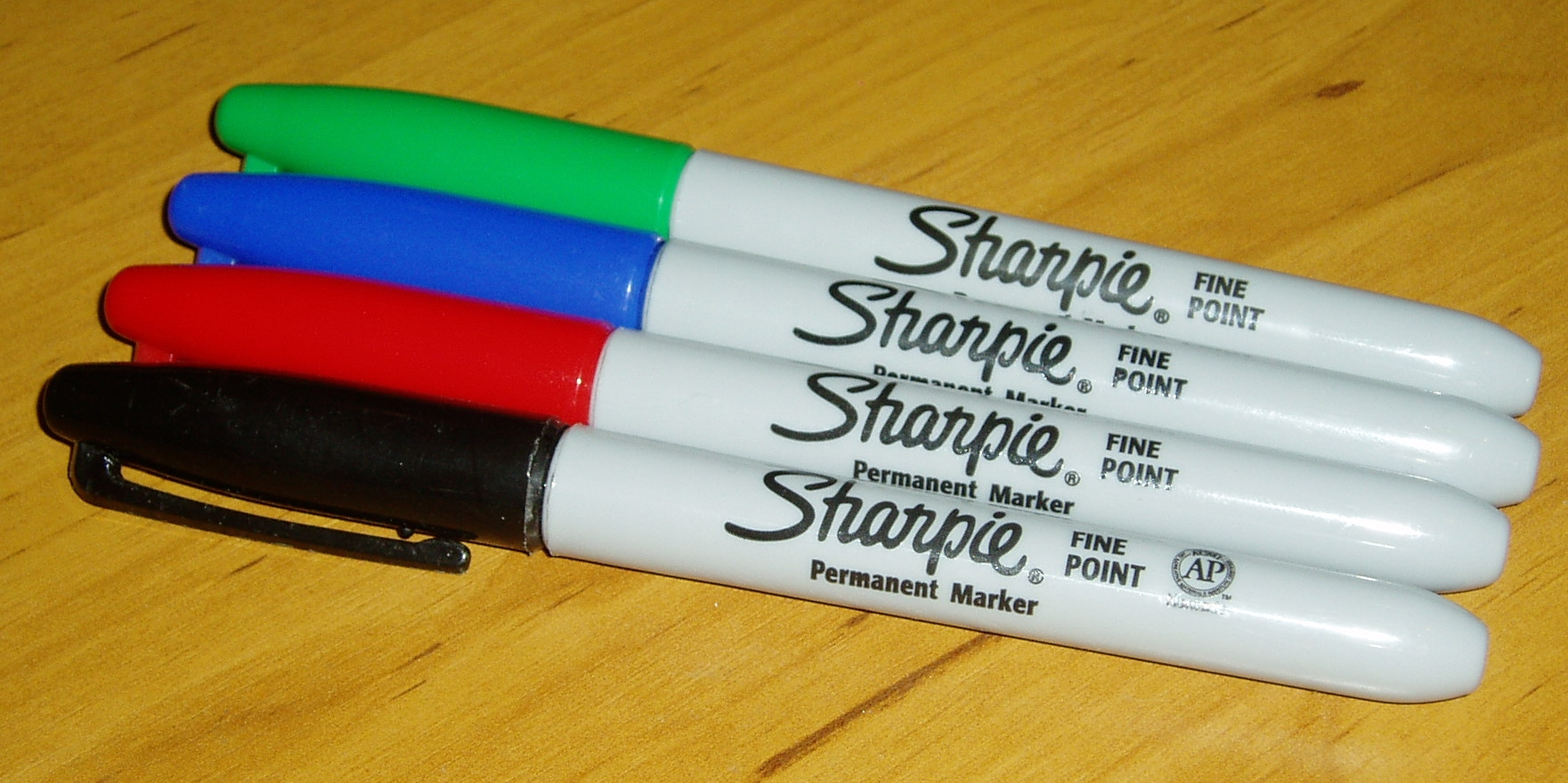
Colored Sharpie permanent maker

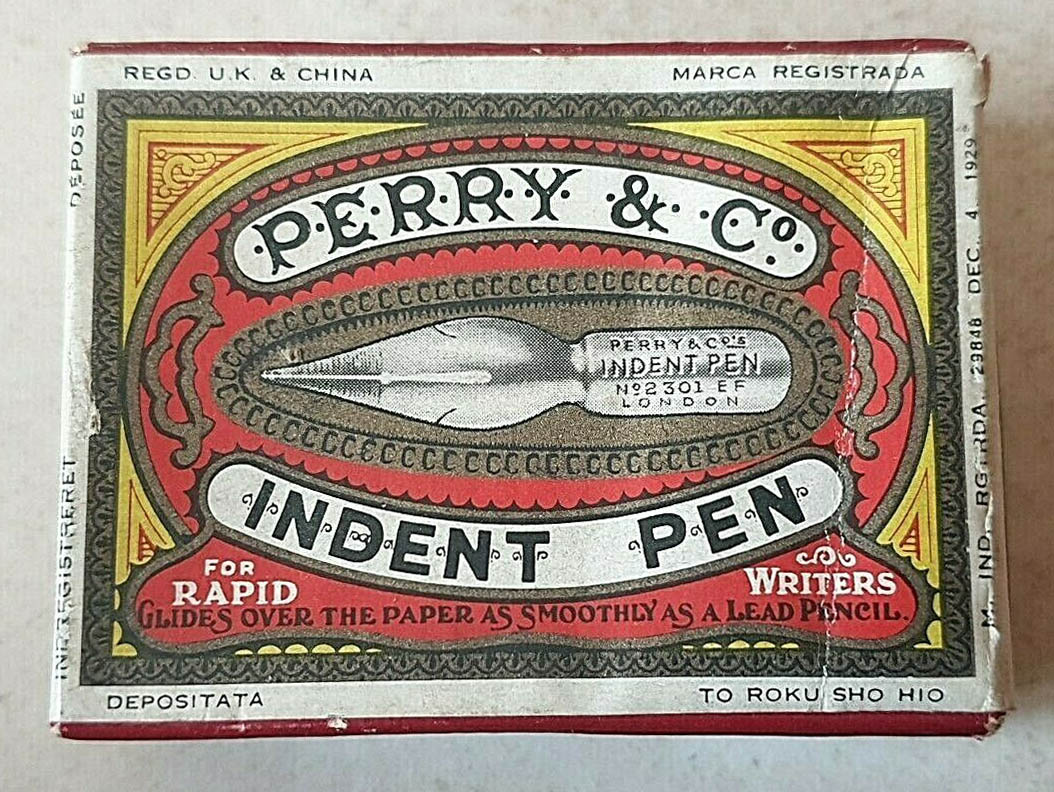
Box of Perry & Co. 2301 nibs

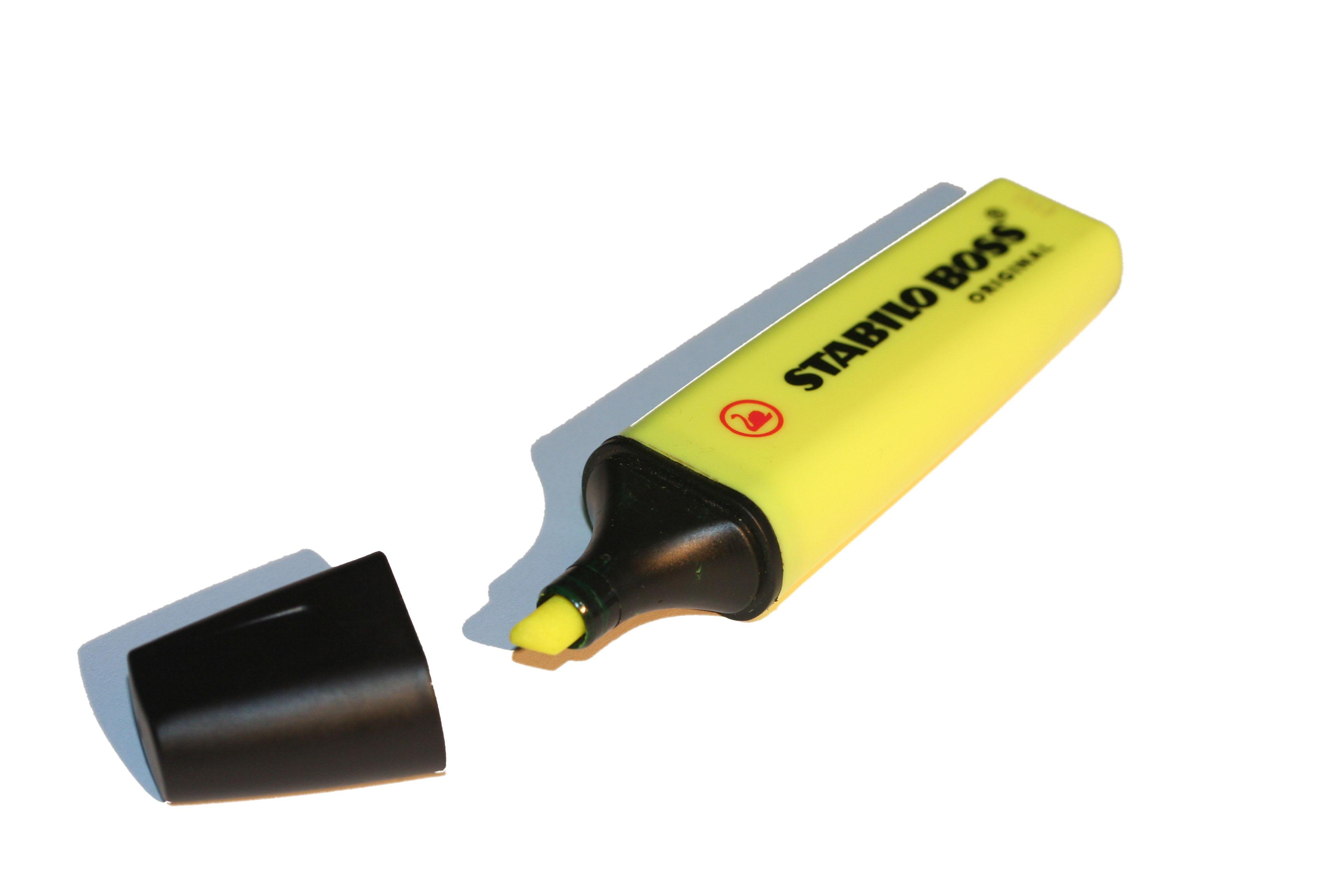
A Stabilo Boss highlighter by Schwan-Stabilo

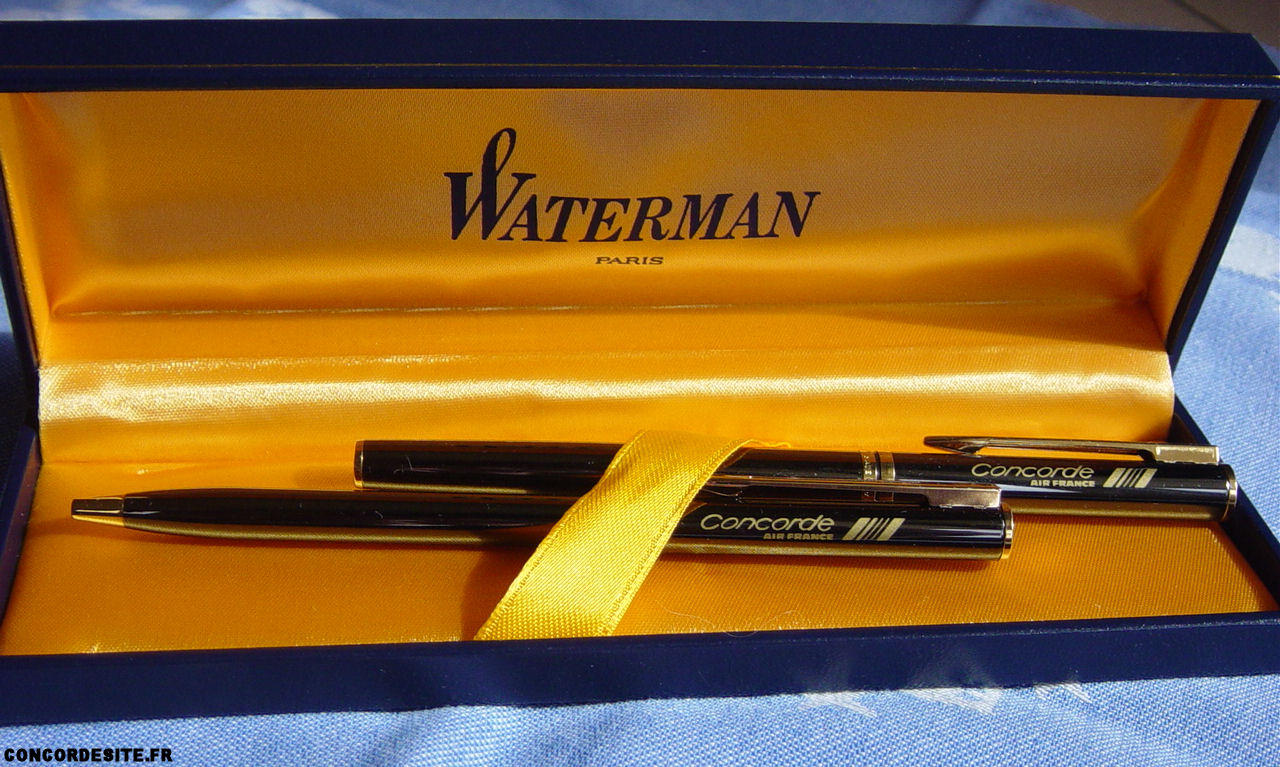
Waterman for Air France's Concorde

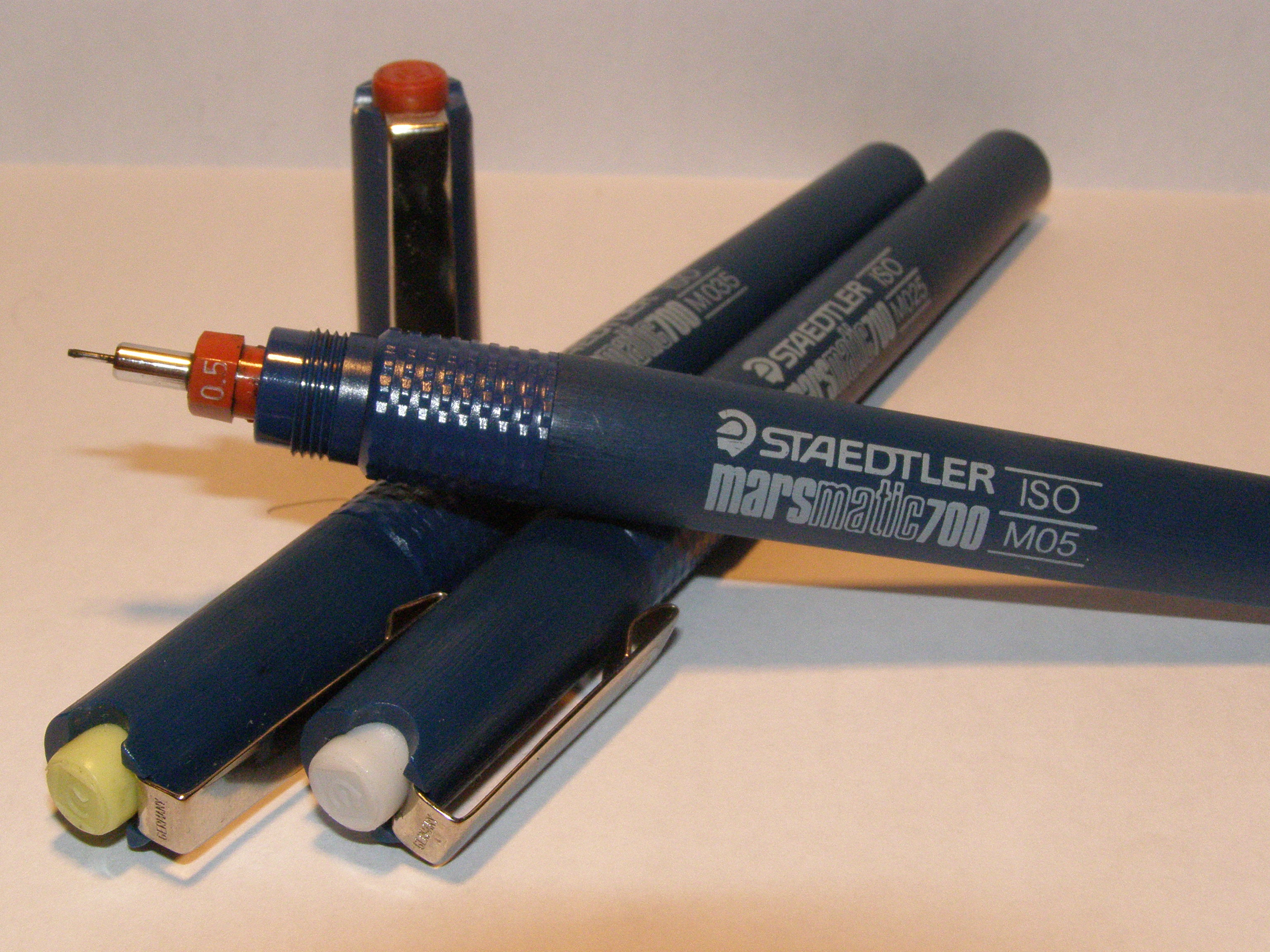
Staedtler technical pens

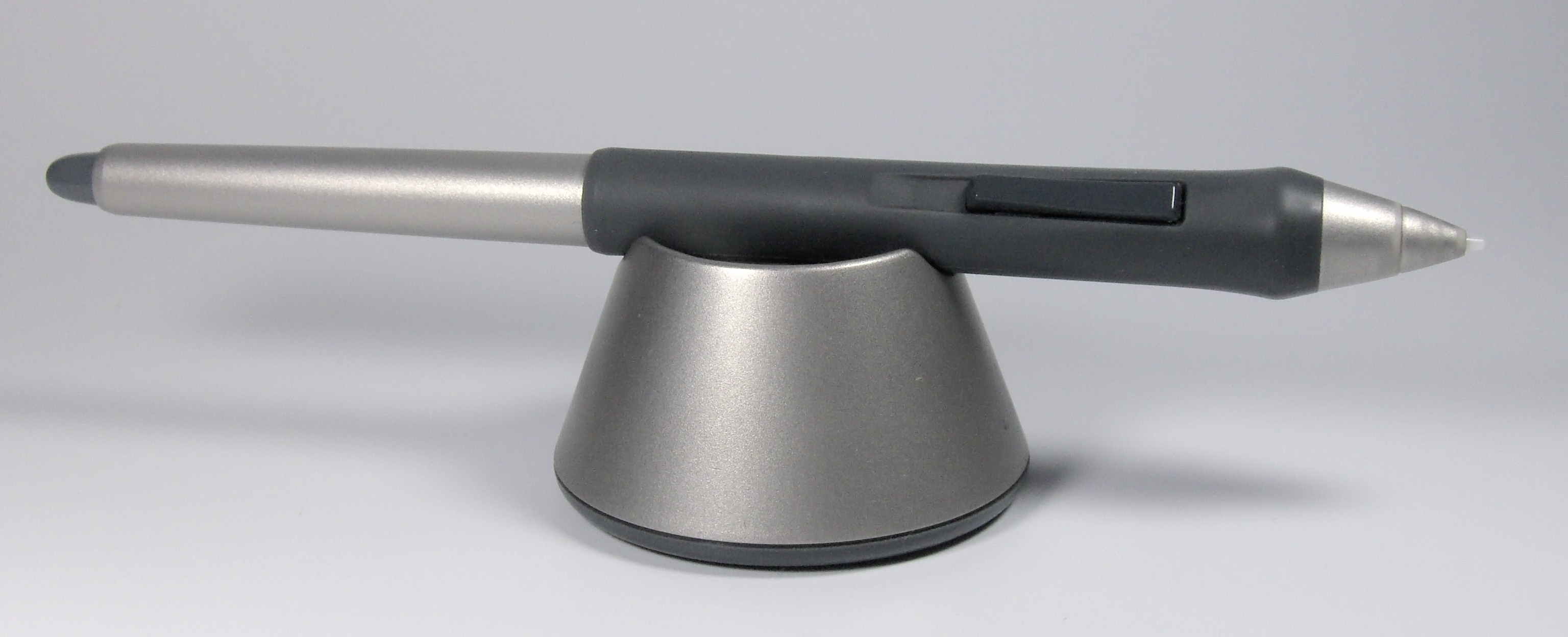
Wacom digital pen

=== A ===
- AIHAO
- Anoto
- Aurora

=== B ===
- Ballograf
- Berol
- Borghini
- Bic

=== C ===
- Camlin
- Caran d'Ache
- Carter's
- Cartier
- Cerruti
- Conway Stewart
- Copic
- Crayola
- Cross
- Curtis
- Classmate

=== D ===
- D. Leonardt & Co.
- Derwent Cumberland
- Displays2Go
- Dunhill

=== E ===
- Esselte
- Esterbrook
- Expo

=== F ===
- F. Weber
- Faber-Castell
- Flo-Master
- Frost & Adams

=== H ===
- Hero
- Herlitz
- Hi-Liter
- Hindustan Pencils
- Hunt

=== J ===
- Joseph Gillott's
- Josiah Mason

=== K ===
- Kaweco
- Koh-i-Noor Hardtmuth

=== L ===
- Lamy
- Levenger Company
- Livescribe
- Luxor

=== M ===
- Macniven and Cameron
- Magic Marker
- Marsh
- Maped
- Monami
- Montblanc
- Montegrappa
- Muji

=== N ===
- Namiki

=== O ===
- Ohto
- OMAS
- Onoto pens

=== P ===
- Paper Mate
- Parker Pen Company
- Pelikan
- Pentel
- Perry & Co.
- Pilot
- Prismacolor

=== R ===
- Reeves and Sons
- Reynolds
- Rotring
- Rotomac

=== S ===
- S. T. Dupont
- Sakura
- Sanford L.P.
- Sharpie
- Schwan-Stabilo
- Sheaffer
- Speedball
- Staedtler
- Swarovski

=== T ===
- Tiffany & Co.
- Tombow

=== U ===
- Uni-ball
- UV marker

=== V ===
- Visconti

=== W ===
- Wacom
- Waterman
- Winsor & Newton

=== Y ===
- Yard-O-Led

=== Z ===
- Zebra

== Related topics ==
- Ballpoint pen artwork
- Birmingham pen trade
- Calligraphy
- Classmate Stationery
- Correction fluid
- Crayon
- Four Treasures of the Study
- Grease pencil
- Ink brush
- Ink eraser
- Inkstand
- Inkwell
- Inkstick
- Inkstone
- Invisible ink
- List of artistic media
- List of stationery topics
- List of terms about pen and ink
- List of pen names
- Noctograph
- Oil stick
- Paintbrush
- Pen spinning
- Pencil
  - Charcoal pencil
  - Graphite
  - Mechanical pencil
- PenAgain
- Pen Museum
- Retipping
- Silverpoint
- Slate and stylus
- Stylus
- Writing implement
- Yatate
