= Yatate =

Japanese writing sets

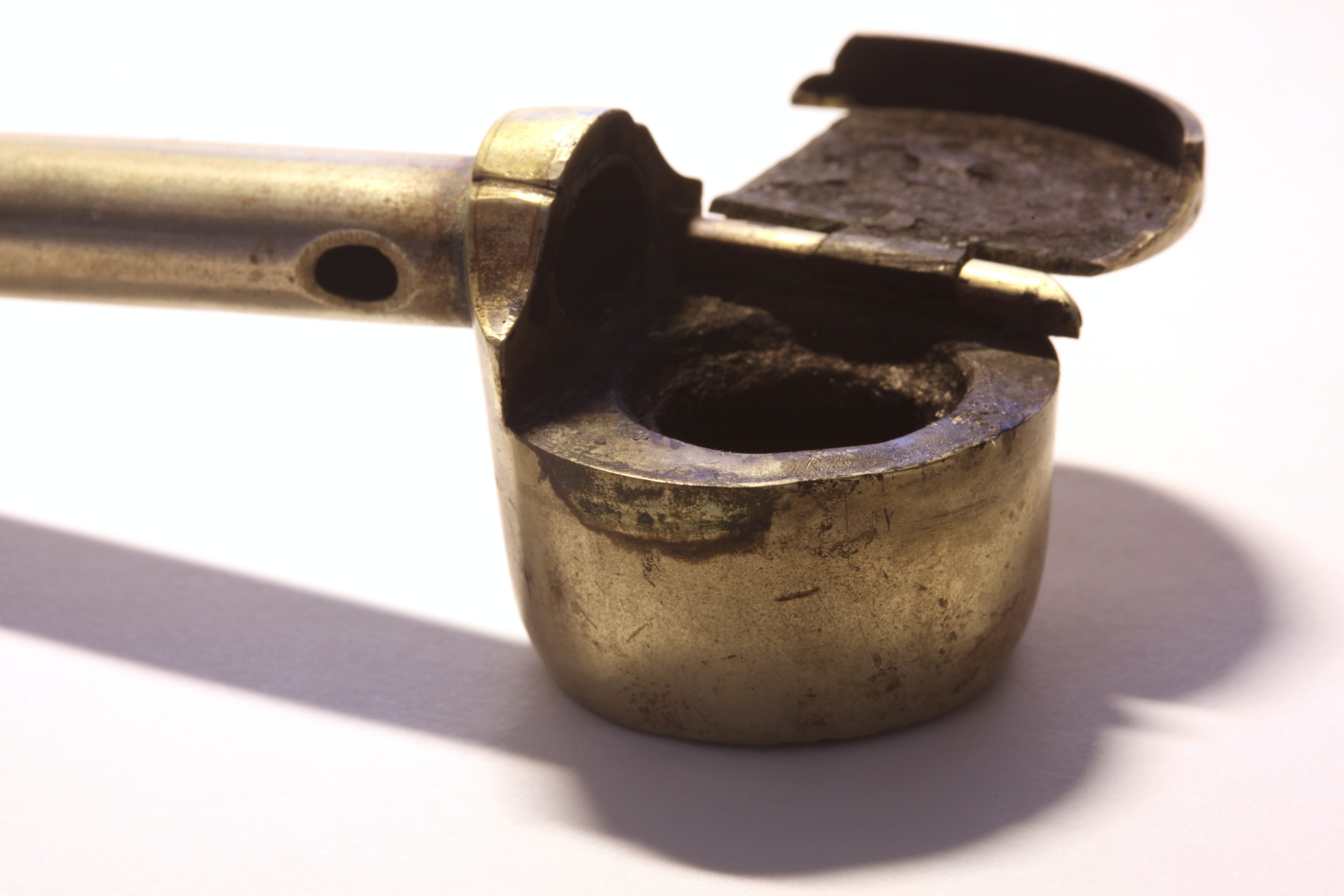
Ink box and pen compartment of an Edo-period yatate.

Yatate (矢立) are small personal smoking-pipe-shaped writing sets from medieval Japan which provided a carrying box for the ink cotton, and a shaft for a brush (and possibly a letter opener).

== Usage ==
Yatate literally means "quiver". The name comes from the practice of early bushi who kept ink stones inside their quivers.

Japanese writing was traditionally done using the writing set inspired from China: an inking stone, a small stick of solid ink (sumi) (which is turned to usable liquid ink by grinding on the inking stone and watering), and brushes. The complete set was easily portable and took time to prepare the materials for writing.

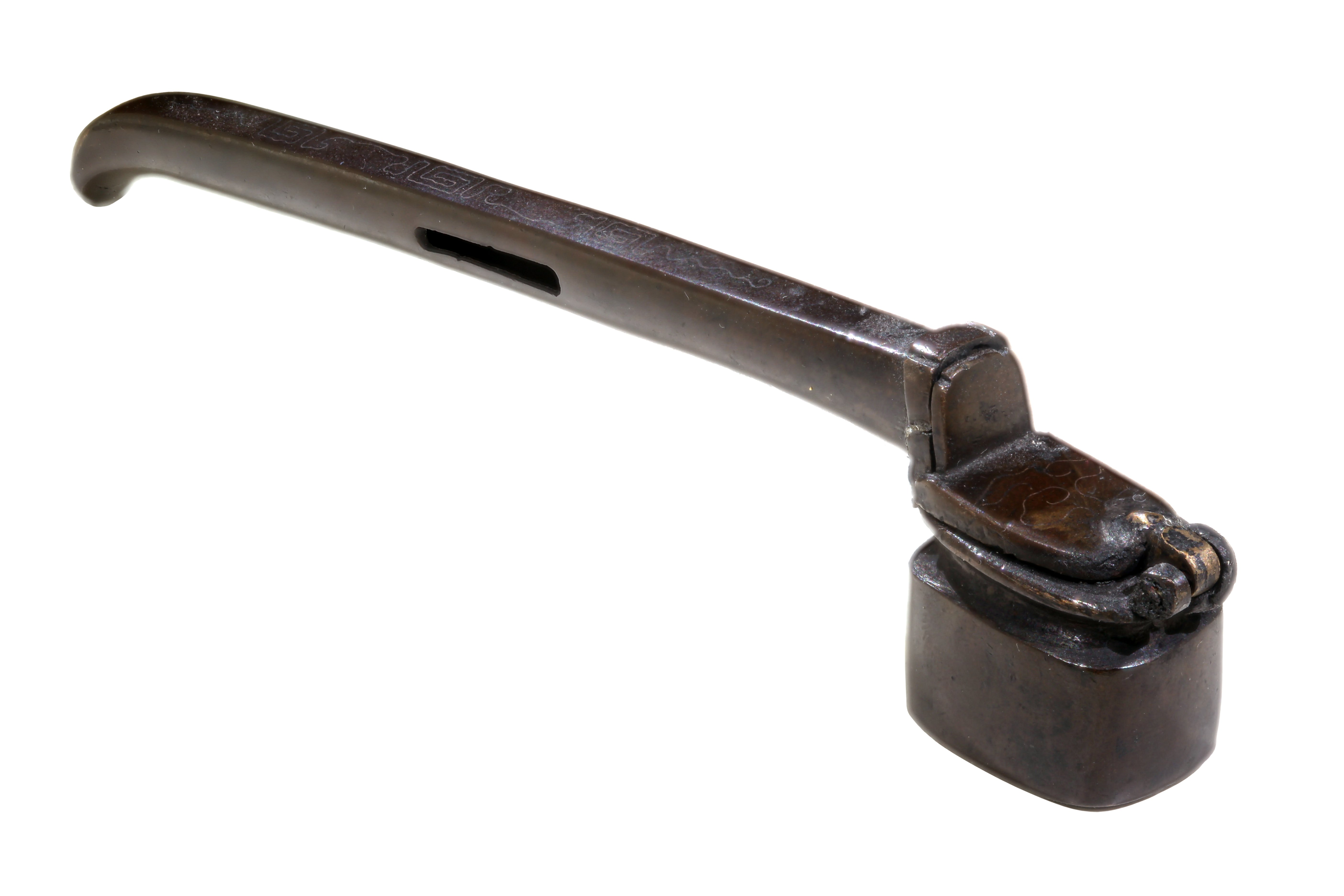
A typical yatate

During the Kamakura period (1185–1333), the idea of ink-saturated cotton was developed. By touching a calligraphy brush to the cotton, one could ink the bristles with reduced risk of dripping or spilling ink. By enclosing the cotton in a little box (sumi tsubo), a writing set was made convenient and portable.

The first yatate were long boxes, with the ink compartment in the axis of the pen. The "smoking pipe" shape was designed to increase the quantity of available ink. In the late Edo period, another design was developed, with the ink box attached to the pen shaft by a chain; the ink box was used as a netsuke to fix the yatate to the belt, while other yatate were simply tucked behind the belt like a fan.

As only members of the samurai caste were permitted to carry katana, some yatate were designed to be used for self-defense. Some late yatate were made of a special alloy of gold and copper called shakudo, specifically designed to turn purple-black over time, and give the yatate its finish.

== See also ==
- List of pen types, brands and companies
