= Ballograf =

Manufacturer of ballpoint pens and mechanical pencils

Ballograf AB
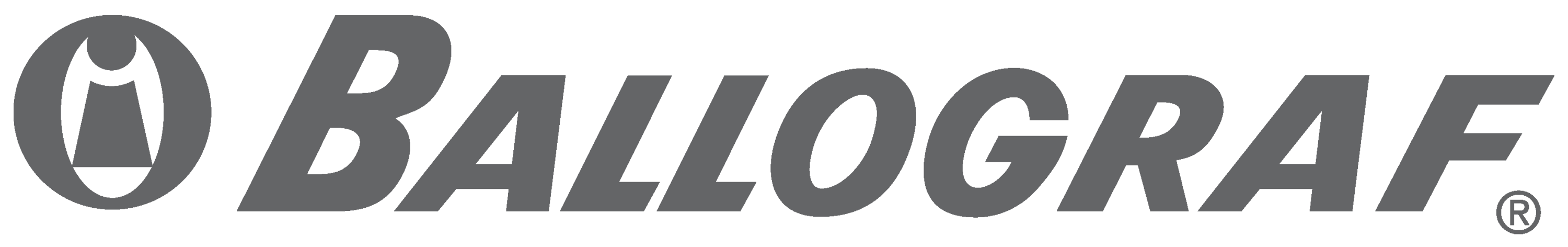
- Type: Private
- Industry: Writing implements
- Founded: 1945; 81 years ago
- Founder: Eugen Spitzer
- Headquarters: Västra Frölunda, Sweden
- Products: mechanical pencils and ballpoint pens
- Number of employees: 30
- Website: ballograf.com

Ballograf AB is a Swedish manufacturer of writing implements. Ballograf manufactures its products from raw materials in its factory in Västra Frölunda, Gothenburg.

Current range of instruments manufactured by Ballograf include mechanical pencils and ballpoint pens. The company is also distributor of several brands in Sweden, such as Sheaffer, Staedtler and Cross, which allow Ballograf to expand its variety to fountain and rollerball pens.

== History ==
In 1945, Austrian Eugen Spitzer, set up a company in Gothenburg with the aim of selling office supplies with the assistance of Friedrich Schaechter, a young Austrian inventor. The manufacturing of ballpoint pens began with Schaechter's experiments on a small scale in a garage on St. Pauli Street. Production subsequently increased and the business moved to Krokslätt Street in Mölndal, with the company now called Ballografverken, where Fritz Schaechter remained until 1951 as head of development.

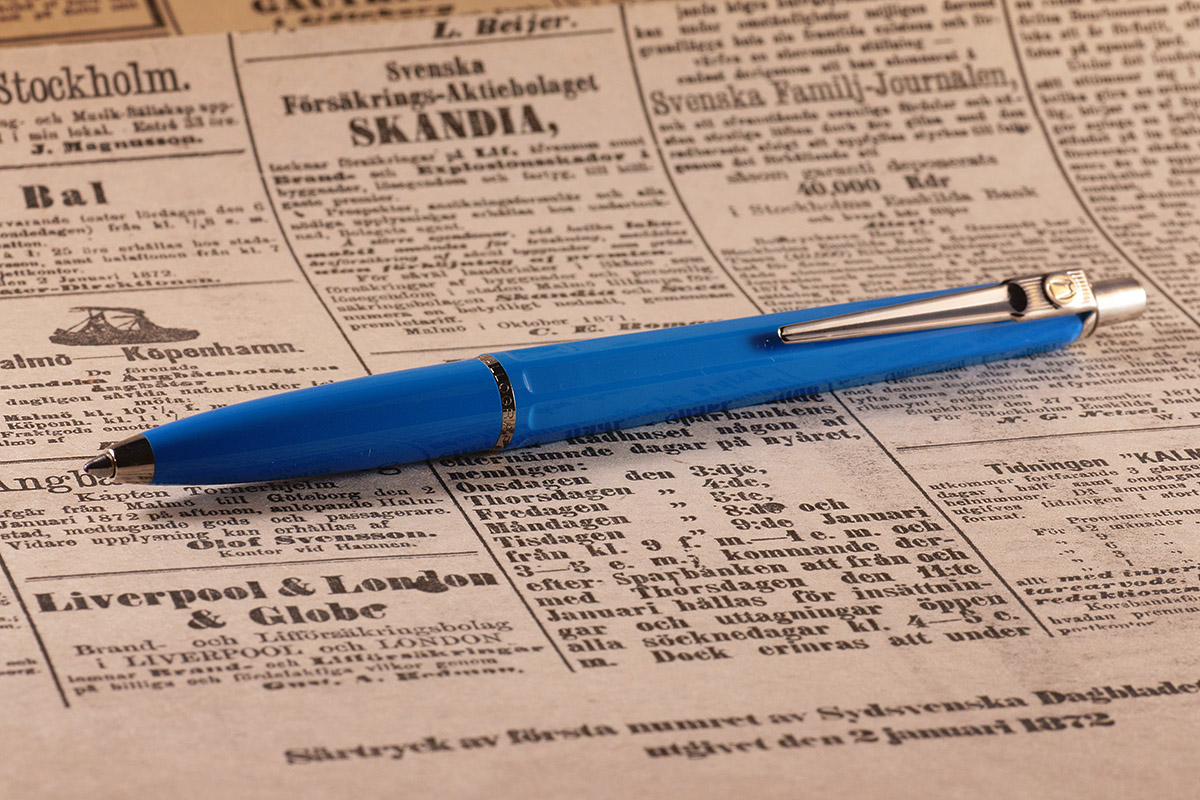
Ballograf Epoca P

The Ballograf brand was marketed throughout the Nordic countries and soon became well known. Ballograf was early in launching a ballpoint pen with a push mechanism, which delivered increased user friendliness. In 1956, Ballograf introduced a ballpoint cartridge containing light-fast ink later certified to become archival ink. This was the major breakthrough for the ballpoint pen as it was now possible for public authorities and companies to use it. Ballograf was the leading brand of ballpoint pen in the Nordic countries. Sales were also progressing in other European countries including Austria, Switzerland and Holland. The company, despite being based on ballpoint pens, also manufactured fountain pens during this period.

In 1959, the company was bought by the French BIC Group, as they wanted to establish their business in the Scandinavian office supplies market.

During 2004, BIC decided to sell the brand, along with manufacture of Ballograf products, to the General Manager of the Nordic operation. The sale was completed on 1 November 2004 and 50% of the company is now owned by Jan Johansson and 50% by Tommy Kvist. Current production is sold world wide with a high acceptance of all its users.

== Annual production ==
Ballograf produces more than 4 million writing instruments per year, with a workforce of only 30 employees. Fifty percent of its output is consumed in Scandinavian countries, while the other half is exported around the world, mainly to Western Europe.

== See also ==
- List of pen types, brands and companies
