= UV marker =

Type of pen

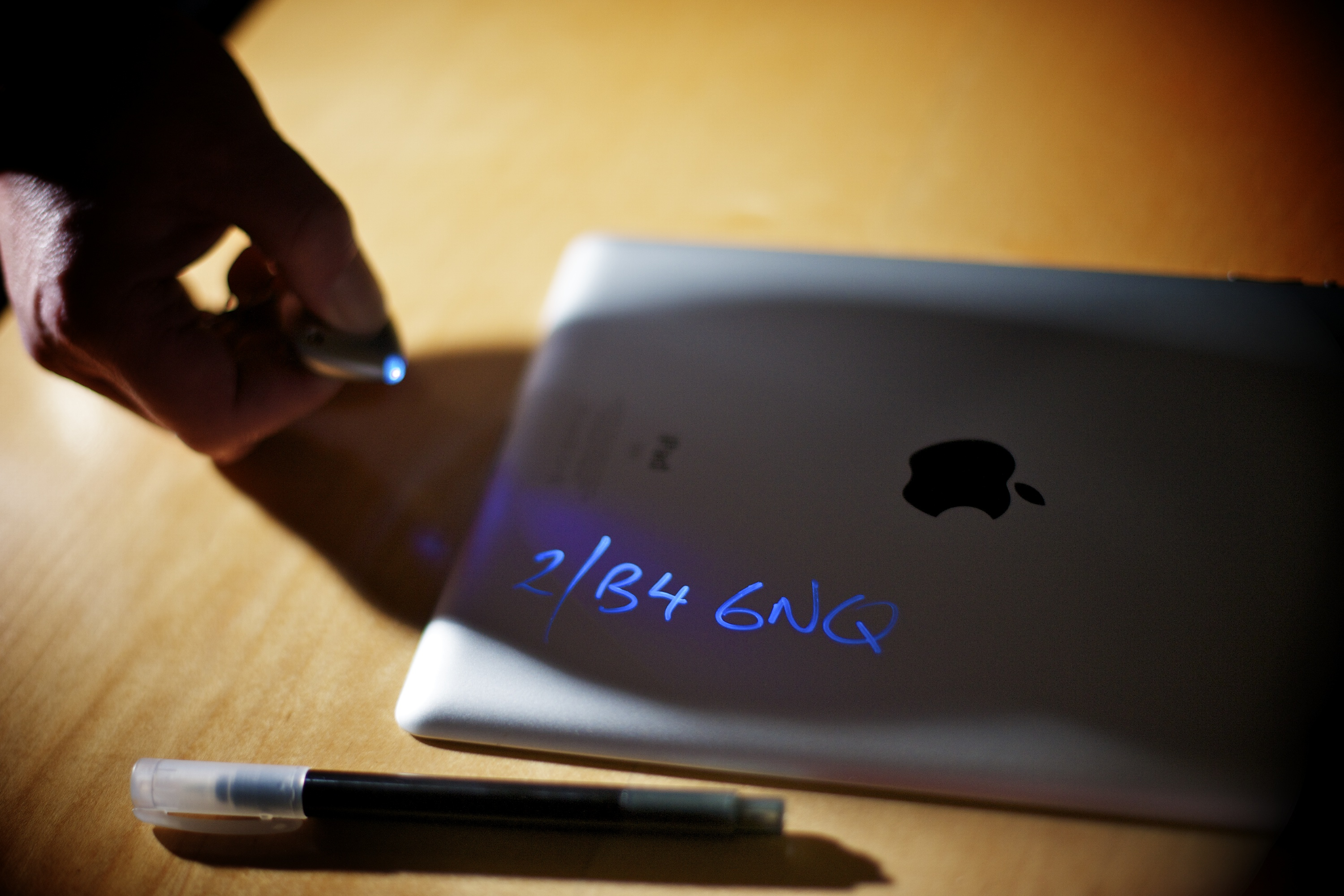
UV marker with UV led lamp

An ultraviolet (UV) marker is a pen whose marks are fluorescent but transparent; the marks can be seen only under an ultraviolet light. They are commonly used in security situations to identify belongings or to prevent the reproduction of unauthorized banknotes. UV pens can now be bought at some stationery shops to securely mark items of high value in case of theft.

== Ink composition ==
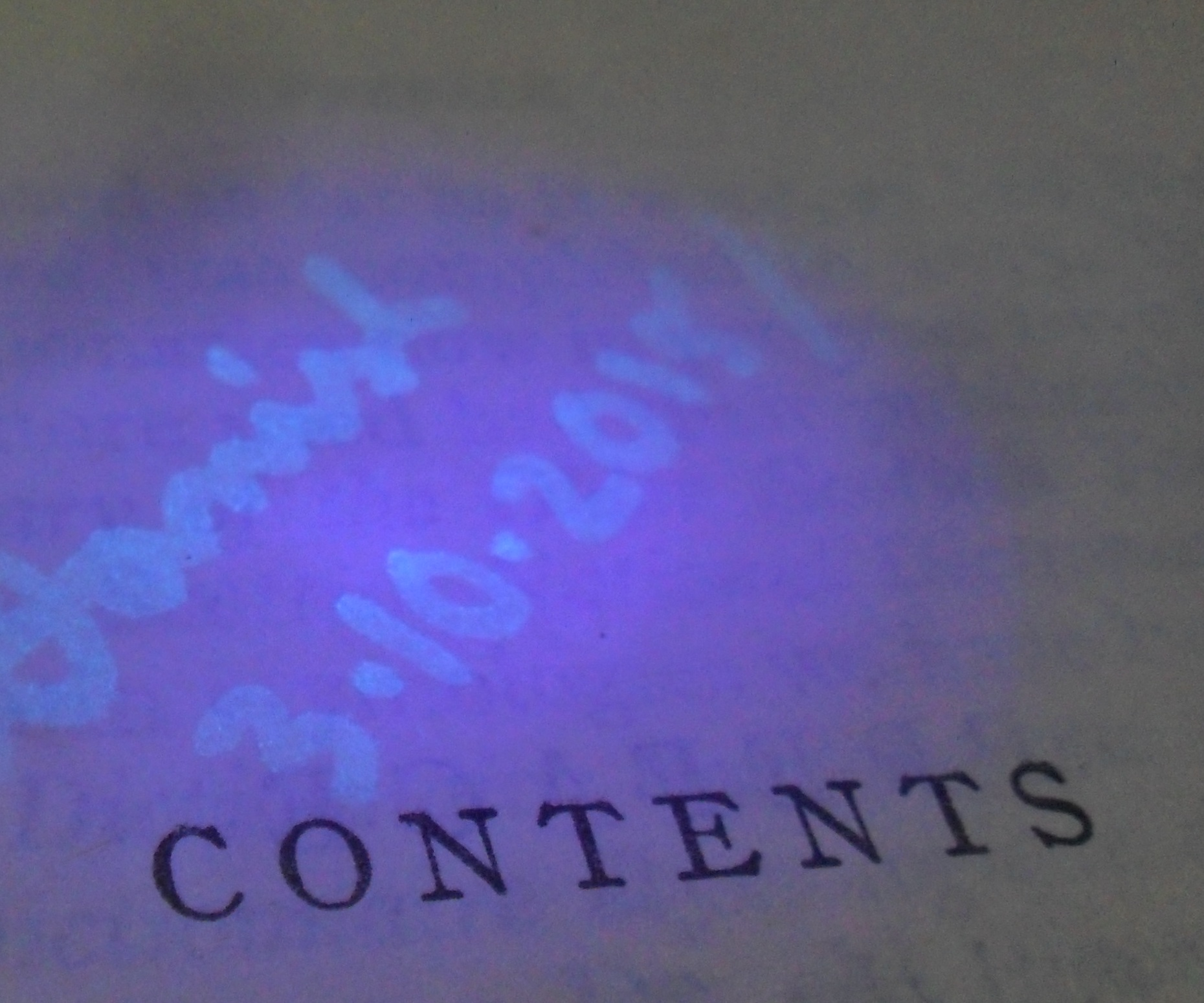
Written text with UV ink

In the past, the ink used in UV markers has been made from various things such as lemon juice, vinegar, diluted blood, or even urine. The main components in improvised inks have included dilute laundry detergent, body fluids, tonic water, and vitamin B-12 dissolved in vinegar.

Modern UV-visible ink uses a fluorescent component derived from materials that glow when exposed to an ultraviolet light. There are different types of UV-visible ink: opaque, semi-opaque, and translucent. All three types contain acrylic monomers which contain a diluent and a photoinitiator to participate in the curing reaction and to respond to UV radiation.

== Mechanism of operation ==
UV LEDs emitting near-ultraviolet light are used to read messages written by UV markers. The near-ultraviolet radiant energy is also called black light with a wavelength of 380 nm, which falls just outside the visible spectrum. The lamps used have very narrow bandwidth, compared to regular fluorescent black lights. Therefore, UV LEDs are claimed to be completely safe, causing no damage to eyes nor risks of skin cancer. When the black light falls upon UV-visible ink, it makes the ink fluoresce so that it emits visible light, making the message readable by human eyes.

In some cases, people can also use photocopiers to develop UV-visible ink messages, because the scanning head of the machine emits UV light.

== Applications ==
=== Security and authentication ===
Commercially available UV markers are used to mark things for security purposes, such as to check for counterfeit money and mark property in the event of theft for the purpose of identifying ownership. It is also sometimes used in identifying whether a document is an original or a copy.

UV markers are also widely used on credit cards or lottery tickets for authentication, to help discourage counterfeiting. For example, in the state of Illinois, the lottery tickets are stamped with UV-invisible ink to indicate authenticity. Credit cards are marked with a particular logo or the card type. Moreover, various countries use UV markers to create marks on state issued driving licenses and identity cards to ensure they are authentic. Other applications include retailers marking their items to identify customers who might exchange or return items that were not originally bought from their stores.

=== Secret messages ===
Many people and organizations use UV markers to protect and hide sensitive messages from the public. Especially during the wartime, invisible inks were widely used by militaries to hide secret messages and important addresses.

During World War II, a competition between laboratories to develop the best invisible ink developed between the Allies and the Axis powers. They were desperately trying to develop new, better invisible inks that could only be revealed by a specialized UV light with a very particular range of wavelengths.

=== Toilet cleaning assessment ===
Supervisors may use UV markers to inspect whether the staff has cleaned a toilet properly, and to rate how well the toilet has been cleaned. The marker used in this case is a lotion which is non-toxic and water-soluble, so it can easily be removed by soap and water solutions. The UV marker is usually applied to the underside of the toilet seat, and is not readily visible under regular room lighting. The toilet will later be visually inspected with a hand-held UV light to rank how well the toilet has been cleaned. The inspector will assign a visual score; 1 represents light fluorescence, 2 for moderate, 3 for heavy and 0 represented no fluorescence. This scoring system is based on visual inspection, and an average cleaning score will be calculated. If no cleaning has taken place, the marker will show heavy fluorescence which will at least last for 7 days after it was applied.

== Limitations ==
Messages written by a UV marker can be discovered by unintended viewers when there is a change of reflectivity of the paper, or a pen scratches marks on the paper. The smell of the ink also reduces the security of secret messages as the hidden messages can be easily found with the help of trained animals.

UV markers should not be used on surfaces that may already contain similar chemicals found in the UV marker ink, such as in high-brightness copier papers. This is because the message will not contrast well on a surface which itself may fluoresce along with the ink when under UV light. Therefore, one should always test in an inconspicuous area to determine results. Similarly, when writing with a UV marker on very smooth and glossy surfaces, the ink will only show an unclear outline of what is written and may be rubbed off easily. This is because the ink is prevented from being deeply absorbed into the surface like it would on a piece of normal paper. Moreover, such messages can be easily visible when exposed under glancing light.

Unlike other invisible inks, which require heat or placing chemical liquid over to reveal the message, the UV invisible ink can be scanned and read quickly with an ultraviolet light source without damaging or changing the surface of the paper. This means that people will not be able to tell or notice if a secret message has been intercepted by a third party.

== See also ==
- List of pen types, brands and companies
