= Borghini =

Borghini is a surname. Notable people with the surname include:

- Vincenzo Borghini (1515–1580), Italian monk, artist, philologist, and art collector
- Raffaello Borghini (1537 – 1588), Italian playwright and poet
- Maria Selvaggia Borghini (1656–1731), Italian poet and translator
- Giampiero Borghini (born 1943), Italian politician and translator
- Paolo Longo Borghini (born 1980), Italian professional road bicycle racer
- Elisa Longo Borghini (born 1991), Italian professional road cyclist
- Diego Borghini (born 1997), Italian footballer
