= PenAgain =

Ergonomic writing device

The PenAgain is an ergonomic writing device developed by Pacific Writing Instruments, Inc. It was designed to alleviate stress and reduce the risk of repetitive strain injury while writing.

Writing with the PenAgain differs from writing with a traditional cylindrical pen. The writer's index finger sits in the Y-shaped device, so that the weight of the writer's hand directs pressure to the pen’s tip. This eliminates the need to grip the pen and push the tip into the paper. The index finger guides the tip of the pen.

== History ==
The bifurcated shape for a writing device was first proposed and patented by John WyttenBach in 1886. Several other iterations arose including The Pen and Brush Holder of Dwight B. Smith and the Penholder by George Cooper Ward. Colin Roche designed the PenAgain while serving detention in high school. The PenAgain went through several design iterations and on October 28, 2003, was granted a patent from the USPTO.
