= Counterfeit banknote detection pen =

Currency authenticator

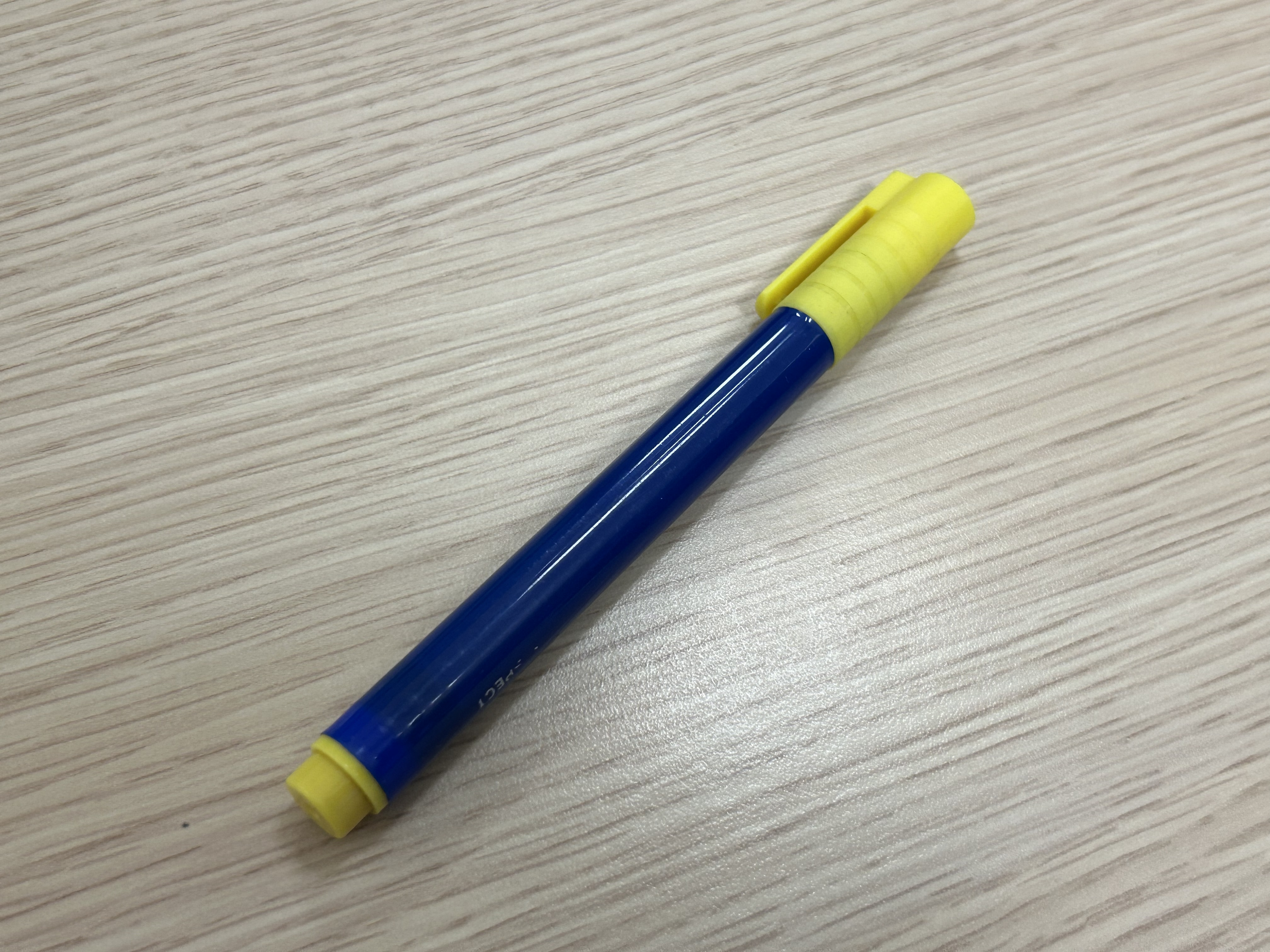
A counterfeit banknote detection pen, used to detect fake banknotes

A counterfeit banknote detection pen is a pen used to apply an iodine-based ink to banknotes in an attempt to determine their authenticity. The ink reacts with starch in wood-based paper to create a black or blue mark but the paper in a real bill contains no starch, so the pen mark remains unchanged.

== Background ==
Counterfeit banknote detection pens are used to detect counterfeit Swiss franc, euro and United States banknotes, amongst others. Typically, genuine banknotes are printed on paper based on cotton fibers and do not contain the starches that are reactive with iodine. When the pen is used to mark genuine bills, the mark is yellowish or colourless.

Such pens are most effective against counterfeit notes printed on a standard printer or photocopier paper. The chemical properties of US banknotes printed before 1960 make marking pens useless, resulting in false positives. One example of this complication taking place happened in 2016, in which a 13-year-old student was arrested by police after she attempted to pay for lunch with a red seal Series 1953 $2 bill after the school's counterfeit pen was unable to prove its authenticity.

== Reception ==
Pen manufacturers claim such pens will detect a great majority of counterfeit bills and are an easy counterfeit detection method that does not require expensive gadgets.

=== Critical reception ===
Critics suggest the effectiveness is much lower. Critics claim that professional counterfeiters use starch-free paper, making the pen unable to detect the majority of counterfeit money in circulation. Magician and skeptic James Randi has written about the ineffectiveness of counterfeit pens on numerous occasions and used a pen as an example during his lectures. Randi claimed to have contacted a United States Secret Service inspector and asked whether the pen works as advertised, to which the inspector replied "it is not dependable." The Secret Service does not include such pens in their guidelines for the public's detection of counterfeit US currency.

US counterfeiters bleach small denominations and print more valuable bills on the resulting blank paper to evade this test, although changes to the currency since 2004 have made this method easier to detect. This is one reason that many countries use different sized notes for different denominations.

==== False positives ====
The effectiveness of the pens may be affected by external methods. Simply having a banknote pass through laundry, depending on the soaps and bleaches used, can cause a bill to fail the test when it is otherwise accepted. Additionally, it was discovered that treating a counterfeit note with a dilute solution of vitamin C will cause a false negative: that is, it will respond to the iodine-based ink as though it were made of the same paper as a valid banknote.

== See also ==
- List of pen types, brands and companies
- Security printing
- Steganography
