= Drop-out ink =

Type of ink ignored by OCR scanners

Drop-out ink is ink specifically colored to avoid reading in high-speed OCR scanners. It is often a pastel yellow, red or orange.

The purpose for dropping out specific colors is to allow the OCR scanner to ignore those colors and operate only on the foreground information.

Drop-out ink is often used in the finance industry for automated paper invoice processing.

Drop-out ink is not the same as inks that have been screened down.
