= Luxor (pen company) =

Indian stationery company

- Type: Private Limited
- Industry: Stationery
- Founded: 1963; 63 years ago
- Founder: Davinder Kumar Jain ("D.K." Jain)
- Headquarters: Noida, India
- Key people: Pooja Jain (CEO)
- Products: Writing implements and office stationery
- Parent: Luxor Group
- Website: luxorpen.com

Luxor International Private Ltd. is an Indian manufacturing company of stationery products based in Noida, India. Luxor manufactures and markets writing instruments and office products under its own brand, also selling Schneider, Parker, and Waterman pens (the last two brands, after an agreement with Newell Brands) in India. In the past, Luxor also marketed Paper Mate and Pilot products.

Luxor is part of the "Luxor Group". With presence in over 95 countries, Luxor is India's largest exporter of writing instruments.

== History ==
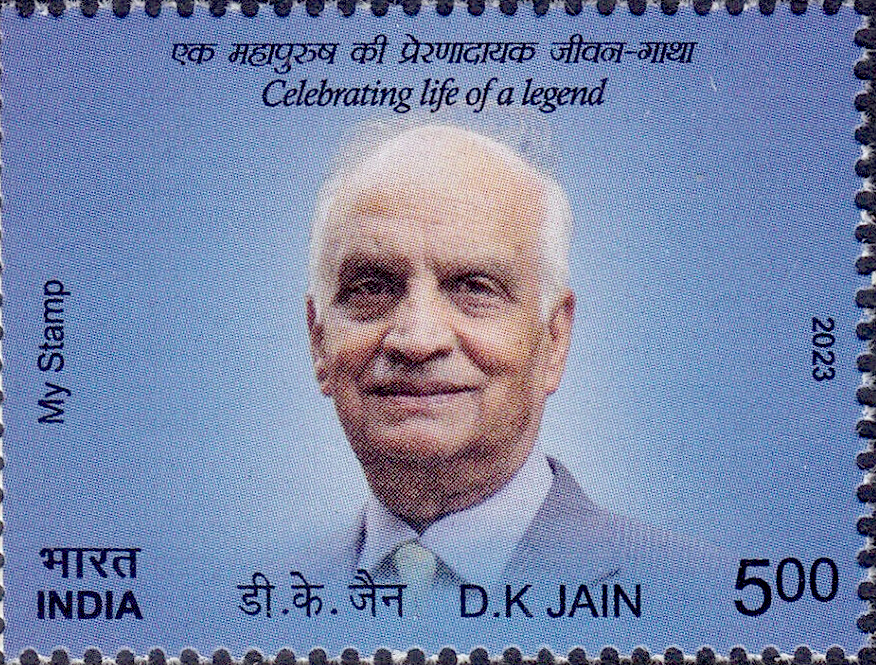
D. K. Jain on a 2023 stamp of India

Luxor was founded in 1963 in India by Davinder Kumar Jain (also known as "D.K. Jain"), with an initial investment of Rs 5,000 and five employees. The company was the first to introduce the fiber tip technology in the country in 1975, followed by the launch of markers and highlighters one year later. In 1980, the company created a division for international business, also becoming distributor of the Japanese brand Pilot. The company opened a new manufacturing unit in Haridwar in 2008.

In 1996, Luxor added Parker pens to its line of writing instruments it sells in India. Luxor also introduced luxury goods brand Waterman in 2003.

When founder and CEO, D.K. Jain, succumbed to a heart attack in 2014, his daughter Pooja succeeded him as CEO. By then, the Luxor Group had over ₹500 crore in revenues.

In 2023, Pilot ended its forty-year-old partnership with Luxor. Luxor has a partnership with Schneider of Germany to sell writing instruments in India.
