= Skin pen =

Medical device

A skin pen (also surgical pen, surgical marking pen, surgical marker pen, surgical marker, or skin marker pen) is type of pen applied to skin to create an image. These kinds of pens are frequently used by surgeons before proceeding with surgery for either medical purposes or cosmetic surgery. They are also often used in tattoo parlours before applying the actual permanent ink.

While long-lasting, this ink is temporary, as it has a specific substance that removes it within 3–4 days.

The sterile surgical pen was invented by Fery Manteghi in the early 1970s whilst he was working at University College Hospital. Research was carried out with scientists at Atomic Energy Laboratories at Wantage.

Research was organised by University College Hospital. Arrangements were made for Mr Manteghi, Mr French (Chief Pharmacist) and Miss Haynes (Deputy Superintendent) to attend Wantage Atomic Energy Laboratories. This was to discuss with the scientists at Wantage the feasibility of sterilising surgical pens using radiation. Trials were successful and safety tests carried out by the UCH pharmaceutical department were also successful.

The pens were first used in the main operating theatres at UCH but are now used worldwide. They are an essential tool for surgeons of reconstructive surgery.

== See also ==
- Eyebrow pencil
