= Sheaffer Prelude =

The Sheaffer Prelude fountain pens, rollerball pens and ballpoints are a line of writing instruments made by the Sheaffer Pen Company.

== Construction & Trim ==
The pen is made out of stock brass rods, and the section is made of moulded acrylic and has ridges for easy grip. The jewel on the clip is made of mother-of-pearl, and the sheet-like cap band and clip are stainless steel. The nib is also stainless steel. The clip and cap band are plated in Gold or Chrome depending on the pen's trim, while the nib is semi-plated in Gold or is unplated Steel depending on trim, but Sheaffer also offers 14K Gold nibs in certain countries in Asia. The Ballpoint is a twist-action.

== Finishes ==
Sheaffer Prelude pens come in a number of finishes, from plain lacquer to plated in precious metals, and from Chrome trim to Gold trim. There was also a Rainbow finish in both trims, but it was discontinued very early and are very desirable today. Another exotic finish was from the "Holiday Original" Sheaffer pens, known as the 'Snow Pen'.

== Nib Sizes ==
The nib sizes offered in the series are Fine, Medium, Broad and Extra Fine. Italic nibs were also offered, but are rarely found today.

== Variants ==
The Sheaffer Prelude comes in only one other variant, a smaller Prelude Mini. It is a ballpoint-only version, and is smaller than the normal Prelude. It is a twist-action ballpoint, and uses standard Sheaffer ballpoint refills.

== Warranties ==
The standard Sheaffer Prelude is warranted under the Sheaffer limited Lifetime warranty, while the Prelude Mini is warranted under the Sheaffer limited 3 Year Warranty.

== Inks ==
The Prelude Fountain pens may be used with normal short Skrip cartridges or International sized cartridges. It is also provided with the standard Sheaffer piston converter, to fill with bottled ink. The ballpoints require a standard Sheaffer Ballpoint refill, while rollerball pens use Sheaffer Classic Rollerball cartridges.
