= Erasermate =

Erasable pen by the Paper Mate division of the Gillette Company

Erasermate (known as the Replay in Europe and Brazil) is an erasable pen introduced by the Paper Mate division of the Gillette Company in 1979.

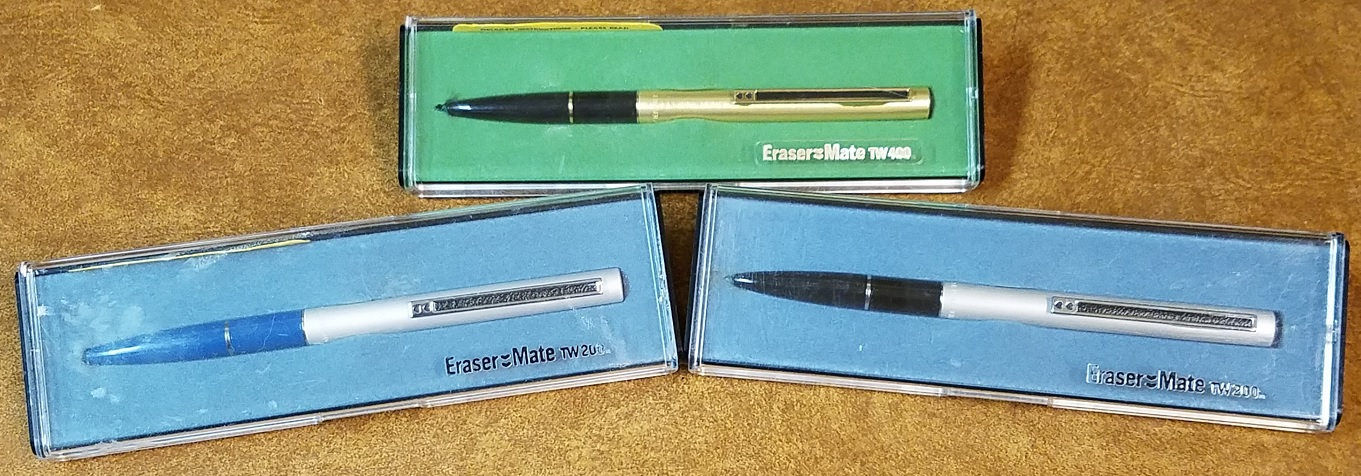
Three EraserMate TW pens viewed in their original cases. From left to right: a blue ink TW200, a black ink TW400, and a black ink TW200.

The original Erasermate pen was a refillable ballpoint pen fitted with a replaceable eraser. A disposable version called Erasermate 2 was subsequently introduced, with an appearance similar to the non-erasable Write Bros. stick pen, except for a slightly larger girth, and of course the black eraser, affixed to the pen's cap. The eraser, similar to that of a standard no. 2 pencil, was about 5 mm in diameter, and 10 mm in length. The eraser was held in place by the force exerted by the cylindrical recess of the pen cap. The eraser could be removed, but replacing it required more effort. Erasermates come in blue, black and red ink, with the pen's exterior often matching the color of its ink.

In 1979/80 Paper Mate introduced two retractable versions of the Erasermate; called the TW200 and TW400, they carried retail prices of $7.50 and $9.50 respectively. The TW name was possibly used to signify "twist", as both the ink cartridge and the eraser would retract by twisting the pen tip, which clicked into place when fully exposed. To close, the user would twist it the other direction hiding the ink and eraser inside the pen's body.

The erasable ink took over a decade to develop. It contains rubber cement and needs to be pressurized slightly for continuous flow during use. A positive consequence of this pressure is that writing is possible through a wider range of paper to pen angle than with non-erasable ballpoint pens.
