= Retipping =

Repair of pen nibs

Retipping refers to the repair and application of iridium tipping material to fountain pen nibs.

Iridium is one of the five platinum group metals. When platinum is mined, it is usually found with one or more of its five sister metals, called the platinum group metals: palladium, osmium, rhodium, ruthenium, and iridium.

John Holland tipped fountain pens with iridium in 1880.
