= Lapis Bard =

- Lapis Bard logo
- Type: Private
- Industry: Manufacturing
- Genre: Fine writing instruments, leather goods, and accessories
- Predecessor: Conway Stewart
- Founded: 2012 in United Kingdom
- Headquarters: Bengaluru, India
- Number of locations: 5
- Area served: UK, India
- Key people: William Penn
- Website: www.lapisbard.com

Lapis Bard is a British luxury and accessories brand owned by William Penn. The company manufactures fine writing instruments, leather goods, and accessories.

Lapis Bard pens collection at Makoba pen store, Bengaluru (2026)

== Company ==
Lapis Bard was formed in UK in 2012 and was acquired by Indian luxury retailer William Penn, in 2016.
