= The Fountain Pen Shop =

Historic fountain pen retailer, museum, and repair shop

- Company type: Store
- Industry: Retail
- Founder: Fred Krinke
- Defunct: November 2019
- Headquarters: 27°56′10″N 82°47′44″W, Monrovia, California, United States
- Products: fountain pens

The Fountain Pen Shop was a historic fountain pen retailer, museum, and repair shop in Downtown Los Angeles, and later, Monrovia, originally established in 1922. The shop is considered to be the oldest pen shop in the United States operated continuously by the same family. Its original location was at the intersection of Sixth and Spring Streets, with its second Downtown Los Angeles location near Pershing Square and its Monrovia location at 2640 S. Myrtle Ave.

== History ==
The Fountain Pen Shop was founded by the grandfather of Fred Krinke and one partner. Krinke's father inherited the business in 1940, subsequently turning it over to Krinke in 1975. Krinke, who was born in 1928, had helped his father at the shop since World War II, during which time the business was backlogged with pen repair orders. Krinke began assisting at the shop in between his classes at Pasadena Junior College. After the war ended, Krinke was drafted for military service, serving in the Air Force. Upon his return, he decided to go into the pen business full-time. In addition to his work at the shop, Krinke made appearances at the Los Angeles International Pen Show--attending every year since its inception--and the Southern California Pen Collectors Club, the latter of which he founded. In 2019, Krinke died at the age of 91, leaving the fate of the 97-year-old business to be determined.
