= Aurora (pen manufacturer) =

Italian manufacturer of fine writing instruments

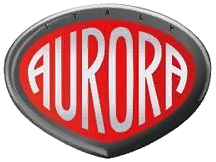
- Formerly: Fabbrica Italiana di Penne a Serbatoio Aurora
- Type: Private
- Industry: Writing implements
- Founded: 1919; 107 years ago in Turin
- Founder: Isaia Levi (financer)
- Headquarters: Turin, Italy
- Products: Fountain pens, ballpoint pens, inks
- Website: aurorapen.it

Aurora is an Italian manufacturer of fine writing implements such as fountain pens, ballpoint pens, and inks. The business was founded in 1919 by wealthy textile merchant Isaia Levi.

The company's products represent the first true Italian fountain pens and are still currently manufactured in their original factory in Turin, northern Italy. Aurora makes a number of small batch production pens, including the Aurora diamanté limited edition diamond embedded pen priced at around 1.46 million US Dollars. It is embedded with 2000 diamonds.

Aurora pen at Makoba pen store, Bengaluru (2026)

== History ==
In 1919 immediately after the World War I, the company was founded as the "Fabbrica Italiana di Penne a Serbatoio - Aurora", with the financial support of Isaia Levi, in Turin, in 1919.

Aurora began to produce fountain pens, first in black only, then adding several colors to its models. In 1929, Aurora started its expansion to other European countries, which led the company to increase its production and introduce new series. Due to the scarcity of gold during the World War II, the company replaced the material with a special alloy named "platiridio", produced and used in some economic models for students.

In 1943, the Aurora factory was completely destroyed by a bomb attack. It forced the company to move to the North of the city. Four years later, the most well-known Aurora model, the "88", was launched. It was designed by Marcello Nizzolli with the aim to compete with the Parker 51. The Aurora 88 sold more than 5 million units all over the world, being in production until the 1970s. Moreover, it is considered the most successful Italian fountain pen. A new 88 model would be produced in the 1990s, but its materials and characteristics were different, appearing like a more conventional fountain pen and breaking with the Parker 51 resemblance showed in the original model of 1947.

In 1954, the "Duo Cart" Aurora was launched. This pen, designed by Albe Steiner, was the first to introduce an ink cartridge to an Aurora model. The cartridge had the particularity of allowing a second cartridge to be linked to the first one by a metal tube, in which a ball was introduced. When the cartridge was empty, the ball moved making a clinking that allowed the student to know that one cartridge was already empty.

Aurora was acquired by the Verona family. From then on, new models were launched, with the "Hastil" – designed by architect Marco Zanuso in 1969 – as the most relevant. This model achieved a huge success, with a copy permanently exhibited at the Museum of Modern Art of New York. It was made of steel, plastic and white gold.
