= Conway Stewart =

British stationery manufacturer

Conway Stewart & Company, Ltd.
- Type: Private (1905–35); Public (1935–2014); Brand (2014–present)
- Industry: Writing implements
- Founded: 1905; 121 years ago in London, England
- Founder: Frank Jarvis and Thomas Garner
- Fate: Brand acquired by Bespoke British Pens Limited in 2014
- Headquarters: Emsworth, Hampshire, United Kingdom
- Products: Fountain and ballpoint pens
- Owner: Bespoke British Pens Ltd. (2014–present)
- Number of employees: 5
- Website: conwaystewart.com

Conway Stewart & Company Ltd is a British manufacturing company of writing implements, founded in 1905 by Frank Jarvis and Thomas Garner in London. The company became notable for its fountain pens, although it also produced ballpoint pens. Conway Stewart was placed in receivership in 2014, with its stocks and assets acquired by Bespoke British Pens Ltd., which owns the rights to the brand since then.

Nowadays, a wide range of fountain pens with the "Conway Stewart" brand are manufactured and marketed by Bespoke British Pens.

== History ==
Jarvis and Garner had previously worked for the De La Rue Company, the leading British fountain pen manufacturer of the time. Drawing on the experience they had gained at De La Rue, the two started their own business, initially reselling fountain pens manufactured by other companies. The name "Conway Stewart" was apparently derived from a popular music hall act of the time.

The fountain pen market in Britain at that time was dominated by De La Rue and it was clear to Jarvis and Garner that only a very limited market share could be gained by reselling un-branded fountain pens. At the same time, De La Rue was embarking on a substantial marketing campaign by re-branding its products "Onoto". Jarvis and Garner identified a market niche for attractive and reliable writing instruments at an affordable price.

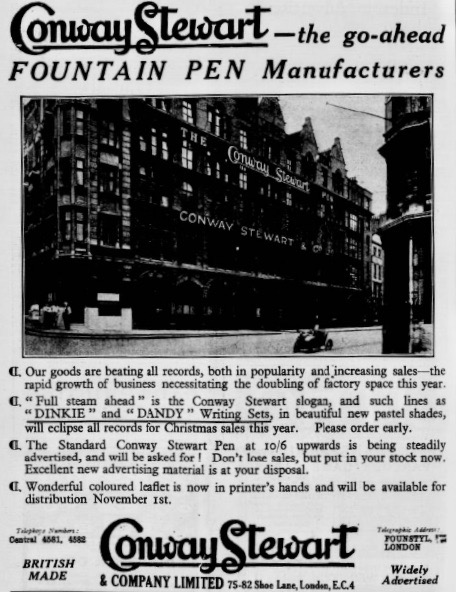
Conway Stewart advert in The Bookseller on 9 September 1927

The 1920s saw rapid development of the Conway Stewart product line. Pens of several different types of filling mechanisms, materials and sizes were offered for sale. The business model proved successful for Conway Stewart and its market share increased at the expense of other established manufacturers. As a result, Conway Stewart had outgrown its initial premises and in 1927 the company relocated to a larger facility which would serve as its home for the next two decades.

During the depression years, the company was able to remain profitable, helped by the public's perception of good value products. In 1935, Conway Stewart went public, raising additional capital at the same time by offering shares. The years of World War II proved difficult for Conway Stewart and many other manufacturers; there were shortages of materials but the company managed to survive by continuing to offer good reliable pens at reasonable prices.

Emerging from post-war austerity in Britain, the 1950s proved to be golden years for Conway Stewart, with the creative use of coloured plastic reaching its peak. The company once again relocated to new premises, but the golden age proved to be short-lived. At the same time, the ballpoint pen was being developed and while initially unreliable and more expensive than comparably finished fountain pens, soon decreased rapidly in price. Conway Stewart, along with most other fountain pen manufacturers of the time, failed to anticipate the effect that this innovative product would have on fountain pen sales.

In the 1960s, fountain pen sales declined very quickly and Conway Stewart began to feel the effect of falling revenues. The company tried to compete by offering lower priced fountain pens and also introduced ballpoint pens to its range. The company relocated to Crumlin, Caerphilly in Wales in 1968, taking advantage of regional development grants, but its financial health continued to deteriorate. In 1975, the company was wound-up and production ceased.

The company was revived in the 1990s, with headquarters in Plymouth, England. Sales started in 1998, although some models had been produced for special occasions before that, including for the Heads of State attending the 1998 G8 Summit in Birmingham.

On 28 August 2014, the company was placed in receivership. The remaining stock, as well as the machinery and tooling, were sold off and its offices closed. Bespoke British Pens went on to acquire the stock of components from the Conway Stewart factory as well as the rights to the conwaystewart.com domain and the Conway Stewart trademark for UK, USA and Europe. The Turners Workshop Ltd in the UK bought all the remaining materials including large stocks of Casein, Ebonite Cellulose Acetate and Acrylics.

== Models ==
=== 1905–1975 ===
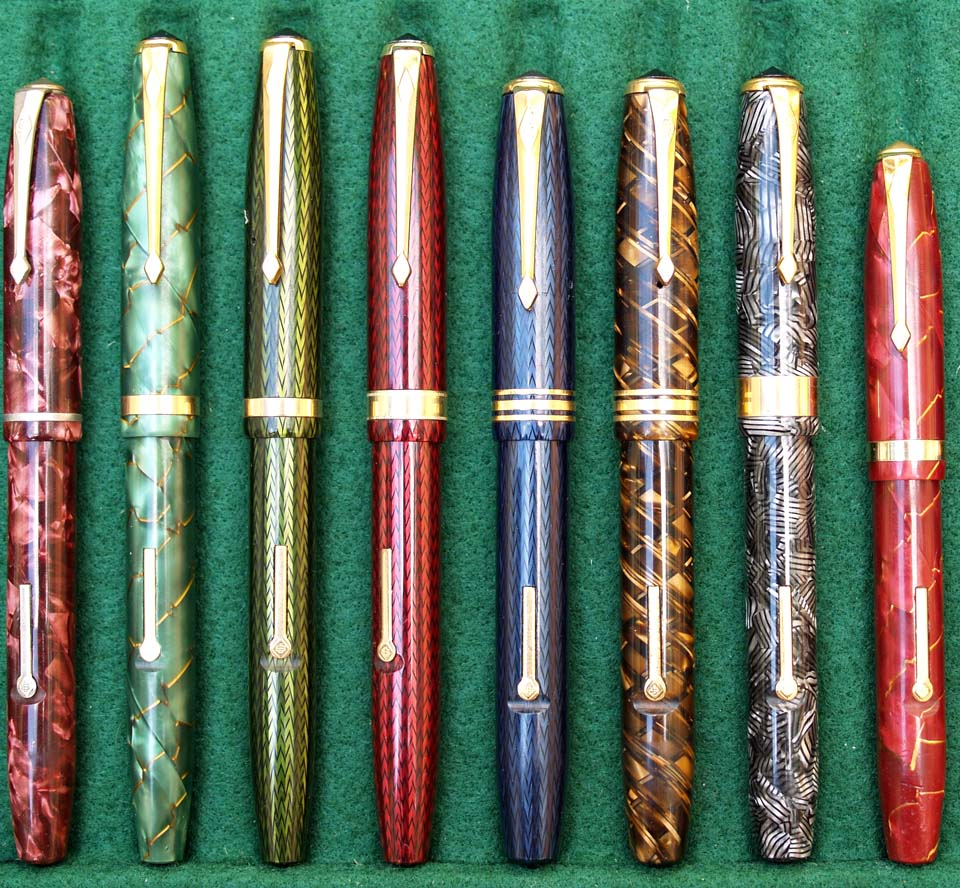
Conway Stewart fountain pens from the 1950s

Early models marketed by Conway Stewart were sourced from other manufacturers, were made of hard rubber and were indistinguishable from many other pens available at that time. By the mid-1920s, the company was establishing its own design style, helped by the use of colourful celluloid and casein plastics.

Conway Stewart's model designation is a combination of names and numbers. Important named models with approximate age ranges include:

- 1920s – 1960s: Dinkie (540–550)
- 1930s – 1940s: Duro (various numbers), Dandie (720, 728), Scribe (336), International (356), Universal (470, 479)

During the 1940s, model names were dropped for all product lines apart from the Dinkie. The model numbering is not chronological and the same pen may appear with a different numbers depending on whether it was sold in Britain or exported. Major model numbers include:

- 1920s – 1940s: 200, 217, 286, 380, 388
- 1950s – early 1960s: 12, 14, 15, 16, 22, 27, 28, 36, 58, 60, 73–77, 84, 85, 100,
- early 1960s – 1975: 65–69, 94–98, 107

The plastics of the 1940s to 1960s were produced in a variety of styles and colours and while never specifically named by Conway Stewart, they have become known informally by collectors by names such as cracked ice, herringbone, tiger’s eye and crosshatch and the more common marbled finish. Of particular note is the model 22 which was produced in the 1950s in a floral pattern. This was produced in very small numbers compared to other models of the time. There is some uncertainty as to the number produced; estimates range from 200 to 2000.

After the early 1960s injection moulded plastic of a uniform colour was used for the manufacture of pens. Nibs, which had been 14ct gold until this time, were generally replaced by stainless steel.

=== 1990s–present ===
Models produced in this era are made for the "high-end" of the market and feature precious metals, enamels and casein or celluloid plastics and 18ct gold nibs. Notable models include the Churchill. 58 series, the Duro series, the Dinkie series and the 100 series, all styled after the original models. The Churchill being based on the larger red ripple hard rubber versions from the vintage conway stewarts. The brand was purchased by Don Yendle over a period of 3 years from 1994 to 1997.

The Conway Stewart trademark in the UK was purchased by Helix from the liquidators in 1975. The trademark was then purchased by another company with a view to relaunching the brand on a range of fibre tipped pen for the mass market, only limited numbers were produced and in 1994 Don Yendle purchased the UK tradename from the company. The USA trademark was purchased from Stuart Edwards of Palo Alto in 1994. In 1995 Don Yendle met with the directors of Shaeffer Australia who had registered the name with a view to relaunching a cheap range of Chinese pens for the Australian market. A meeting was held in Hong Kong in early 1995 whereby Don Yendle purchased the rights to the CS tradename for Australia.

Having formed Conway Stewart as a Limited Company in the UK the trademark was registered in Europe and Asia to ensure worldwide security for the brand. Having researched Conway Stewarts previous manufacturing history and techniques Don Yendle wanted to keep true to its core values from 1905. What followed were 3 years of research into Casein and plastics including vulcanite for barrels and feeders for nibs. The company even used a Birmingham-based company who still used a 1-metre pantograph to make the miniature moulds for the pen clips in order to keep the detail in the clips. All of the new clips were exactly the same size as the originals so pen collectors would have spares for the vintage pens they wished to repair.

After much experimentation with slabs of casein from uk and some very old stock from Japan Conway Stewart re-launched in 1997. At that first exhibition the Foreign Office chose Conway Stewart as a supplier of gifts for Number 10 Downing Street and gifts from the government to visiting dignitaries. The first collections (58 series and Dinkies) were all made from casein with solid gold rings swaged on to each cap. Each slab of casein had to be cured for at least 3 months in drying room with just the right humidity. Returning the barrels to the drying room after each process in order to train the material to be 'round'. Each collection was limited to 500 pcs based on material and colour. Each pen code and number laser engraved on to each barrel.

The company then introduced designs (Churchill series, 58, Dinkie) in acrylic, solid silver, and solid gold. The first solid gold pens were made for Her Majesty Queen Elizabeth and HRH Prince Philip on the celebration of their golden wedding anniversary 20 November 1997. Two pieces were made in 18ct solid gold. The queen wrote a letter of thanks for the gift stating they were 'useful to boot'. The pens were originally made in Horrabridge and the company moved to its Plymouth premises in 2001 having outgrown the original premises. The company continued to produce pens for the Prime Ministers Office, supplying birthday presents of a Conway Stewart Churchill to Bill Clinton, George Bush, Jacques Chirac, Vladimir Putin to name but a few.

The pens were also selected by the Foreign Office as gifts to all world leaders at the G8 and G20 summits, along with pens for Prince Charles, Princess Diana and Barbara Cartland. Conway Stewart introduced a few prototype celluloid pens, mainly as overlays on solid silver Duro pens. The company supplied another set of gold pens for the celebration of Her Majesty's Golden Jubilee featuring a hard rubber Churchill with an 18ct Overlay. Only a few pieces were sold. Don Yendle sold the company to an investor in October 2003 having established worldwide distribution.

== Bibliography ==
- Hull, Stephen (2010). Fountain Pens for the Million, The History of Conway Stewart 1905–2005. Shelley and Peacock; Marlow, UK. ISBN 978-0-9563444-1-0.
- Lambrou, Andreas (2003). Fountain Pens of the World. Philip Wilson Publishers, London. ISBN 0-3020-0668-0.
- Lambrou, Andreas (2000). Fountain Pens of the United States of America and the United Kingdom. Philip Wilson Publishers, London. ISBN 0-85667-532-6.
- Steinberg, Jonathon (1997). Identifying Fountain Pens: The New Compact Study Guide and Identifier. BookSales Inc, NJ. ISBN 0-7222-6262-0.
