= Visconti (company) =

Italian luxury good manufacturer

Visconti S.r.l.
- Type: S.r.l.
- Industry: Luxury goods
- Founded: 20 October 1988 in Florence
- Founder: Luigi Poli and Dante del Vecchio
- Headquarters: Florence, Italy
- Key people: Dante Del Vecchio; Luigi Poli
- Products: Fountain pens, nibs, watches
- Website: www.visconti.it

Visconti is an Italian manufacturing company of luxury goods, founded in 1988 in Florence by Dante Del Vecchio and Luigi Poli, who were collectors of fountain pens. The company is noted for its use of celluloid in the making of its pens, adding details in ivory, titanium, gold, diamond, ebonite, and acrylic fiber.

Visconti's handmade fountain pens have been recognised for their quality and fine craft. Its line of products has changed over time, with several collections released since the company's inception.

Visconti ′Homo Sapiens′ pen at Makoba pen store, Bengaluru (2026)

== History ==
The company was founded on the 20th of October, 1988, by Luigi Poli and Dante del Vecchio, two friends that were fountain pen enthusiasts.

The first collection launched by Visconti was the "Classic", a pen made of celluloid, which would be used for several collections in successive years. The success of this pen encouraged the company's founders to release a new limited edition of a hundred pieces, "Urushi", made of ebonite and decorated with Japanese lacquerware techniques.

During the 1990s, Visconti developed the high vacuum power filler system (1993), the travel inkwell (1997) and the double reservoir filling system (1998), which consisted of a double reservoir refilling system, to prevent leakage. By 2008, the company had 25 employees who made its pens by hand.

In 2009, Visconti reached a deal with Coles of London (actually based in North Carolina), whereby Coles became the official distributor of Visconti products in the United States. Together, both companies launched a range of new products, including the Rembrandt Collection, Opera Masters, Homo Sapiens Collection, Divina Royale range, and the limited-edition Templari.

By 2012, Visconti had exported its products to more than 50 countries around the world with 50,000 pens sold by year.

Dante Del Vecchio left Visconti in 2016 due to a conflict with his business partner and later became chief pen designer at Pineider.
