= Shanghai Hero Pen Company =

Chinese pen manufacturer

- Formerly: Wolff Pen Manufacturing Company (1931–66)
- Type: Private
- Industry: Writing implements
- Founded: 1931; 95 years ago in Shanghai, China
- Headquarters: Shanghai, China
- Products: Fountain pens
- Parent: Shanghai Hero Group Co. Ltd.

The Shanghai Hero Pen Company (Chinese: 上海英雄（集团）有限公司; pinyin: Shànghǎi yīngxióng (jítuán) yǒuxiàn gōngsī) is a Chinese manufacturing company which is popular for its Hero (英雄; yīngxióng) fountain pens. It was founded in 1931 as the "Wolff Pen Manufacturing Company" (上海华孚金笔厂; Shànghǎi huáfú jīnbǐ chǎng), and was renamed in 1966 to the current name. Hero is commonly referred to as "Huáfú" which is the Hanyu Pinyin transliteration of the firm's abbreviated original Chinese name.

The Shanghai Hero Fountain Pen is currently a subsidiary of the Shanghai Hero Group Co. Ltd., which owns ten stationery companies and more than 100 trademarks in China.

== Overview ==
Hooded nib of a Hero pen

By the 1990s, the company's Hero brand fountain pens had earned a reputation in China as the best in the country. Hero pens were also popular internationally during the 1980s and 1990s and remain especially desirable among users of fountain pens in India.

Some of its brands of fountain pens include Hero, Wing Sung, Lucky, Huafu, Xinming, Guanleming, Xinhua, and Gentleman. The design of some of its Hero pens, such as the Hero 616 or Hero 100, resemble that of the Parker 51, a popular American-made pen.

Hero fountain pens were very popular in India from the 1970s to 1990s. Popular models included the Hero 329, Hero 221 Hero 233 and the higher-end Hero 100. These pens used an aerometric ink filling system, though modern variants of the Hero 100 use a standard international cartridge-converter.
