= Demonstrator pen =

Pens which are partially or mostly transparent

Demonstrator pens are models which either are transparent or have cutaways making their internals visible.

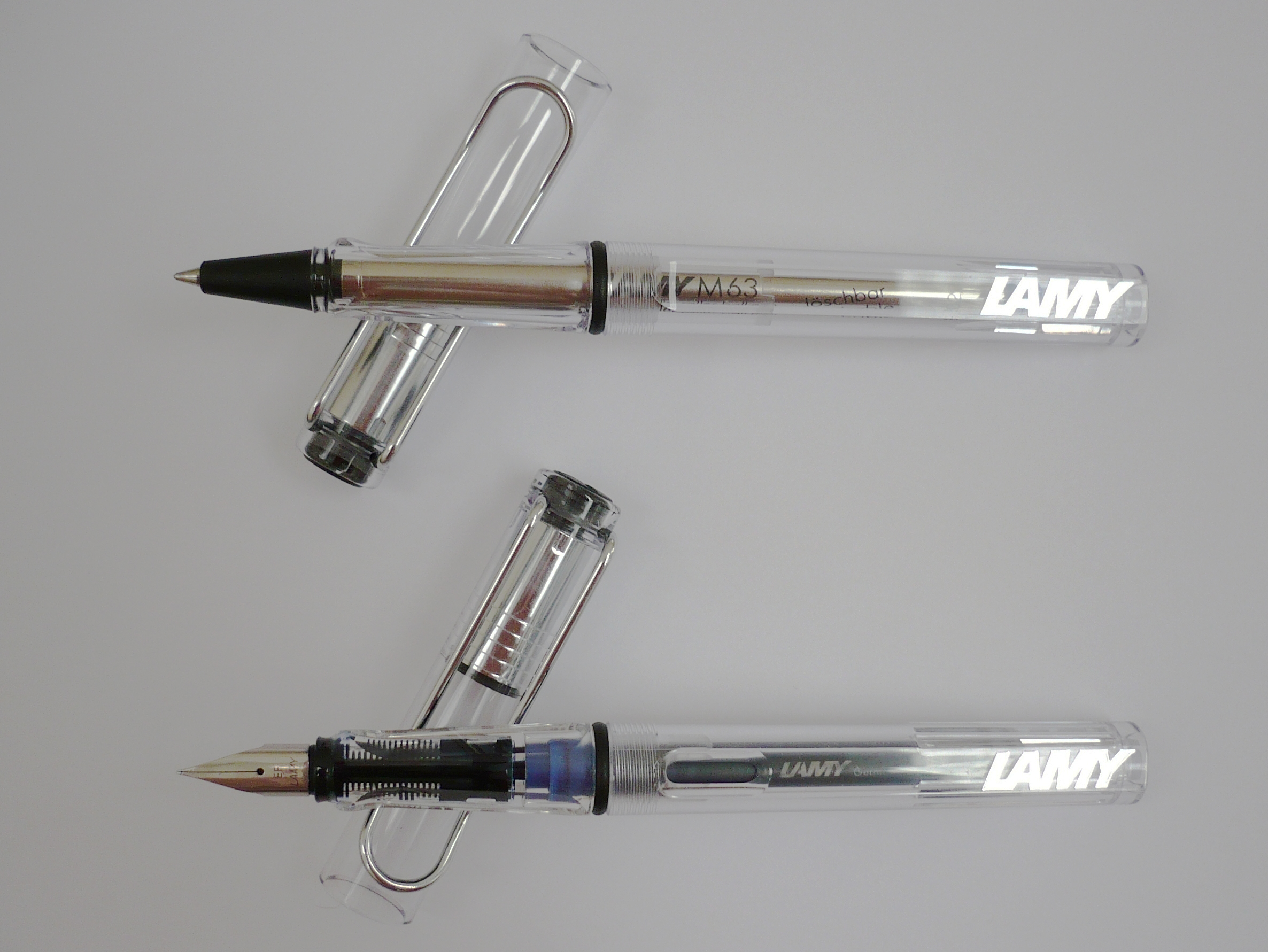
Lamy Vista rollerball (top) and fountain demonstrator pens.

Demonstrator pens were originally special models provided by fountain pen manufacturers to dealers, so that the features of their products could be shown to potential buyers. The first demonstrators had openings cut in their barrels and sometimes their caps as well. These would typically allow direct viewing of the filling mechanism and the section-inner cap junction, respectively. Cutaway demonstrators were usually not fully functional pens, and many were furnished without nibs or with nonfunctional dummy nibs.

== History ==
The first transparent demonstrator pens were probably Parker's Bakelite-barreled eyedropper-fillers, which were soon made a regular production model. Most transparent demonstrators, however, postdate the general adoption of celluloid for fountain pen manufacture. Parker and Sheaffer both made fully transparent versions of their best-selling Duofold and Balance models in the early 1930s. Other demonstrators were only partially transparent, the transparency highlighting the pen's special features. Examples include the transparent-barreled Parker Vacuum Filler demonstrators (showing the filling mechanism) and the Parker 51 demonstrators with transparent hoods (showing the collector).

Vintage pen collectors define demonstrators as pens that were not offered to the general public. For new pens, however, "demonstrator" has come to be used to describe any model that is entirely or nearly entirely transparent. Such pens are popular, a trend that may be traced back to Pelikan's transparent green M800 and transparent blue Blue Ocean M800 of 1992.
