= Goulet Pens =

Online retailer of fountain pens

- Goulet Pens logo
- Type: Private
- Industry: Retail
- Founded: 2009
- Founder: Rachel and Brian Goulet
- Headquarters: Henrico, Virginia, United States
- Number of locations: 1
- Revenue: $13,800,000
- Number of employees: 39
- Website: https://gouletpens.com/

Goulet Pens is a Henrico, Virginia-based online retailer of fountain pens, ink, paper, and related supplies. The company was founded in 2009 by Rachel and Brian Goulet as a seller of handmade wooden fountain pens. Rachel Goulet is chief operating officer and Rachel and Brian Goulet are co-presidents of the company.

Goulet Pens sells from brands such as Pilot, LAMY, Platinum, Diplomat, Jinhao, Monteverde, Pelikan, and others.

Newsweek named Goulet Pens as one of America's Best Online Shops 2024, and Forbes named it the fifth-best among small and medium workplaces in retail in 2019.

== Financial data ==
Between its founding and 2018, the company had double-digit growth every year, attributing its growth in part to a consumer trend of the revival of analog products. Goulet Pens grew more than 50 percent year over year in 2014. Its annual revenue as of 2019 is $13,800,000.
