= Onoto pens =

British brand of fountain pens

Onoto
- Product type: Fountain pens
- Current owner: The Onoto Pen Company Ltd. (2005–)
- Country: United Kingdom
- Introduced: 1905; 121 years ago
- Discontinued: 1958–2005
- Previous owners: De La Rue (1905–58)
- Registered as a trademark in: International (serial #79196318)
- Website: onoto.com

Onoto is a British brand of luxury fountain pens and accessories. Originally manufactured by Thomas De La Rue & Company, Limited from 1905 until 1958, the brand was relaunched by "The Onoto Pen Company Limited", based in Colney Hall, Norwich in 2005. Onoto pens have been used by numerous notable people from history such as Field Marshal Douglas Haig and Prime Minister Winston Churchill. Other famous names include Florence Nightingale, Edgar Wallace and Natsume Soseki, the foremost Japanese novelist of the Meiji Era.

The origin of the brand name Onoto is unknown. One suggestion is it is derived from Ono Tokusaburo, a Japanese watchmaker. Another theory is that it was a made-up name chosen specifically for its ease of pronunciation in order to boost global sales.

== History ==
=== Early years ===
Thomas De La Rue & Company, Limited, which was one of the world's largest printers of postage stamps, banknotes, and playing cards, had manufactured fountain pens for most of the later part of the 19th century. In 1881 it produced the Anti-Stylograph pre-dating Lewis Waterman's first pen by three years. These writing instruments were well received throughout the British Empire and around the globe.

The Onoto pen was invented by George Sweetser, a mechanical engineer, in 1905. Sweetser offered his invention to Evelyn De La Rue –the eldest son of Thomas De La Rue– who immediately accepted. Other versions state that the Onoto pen was invented jointly by Sweester and Evelyn.

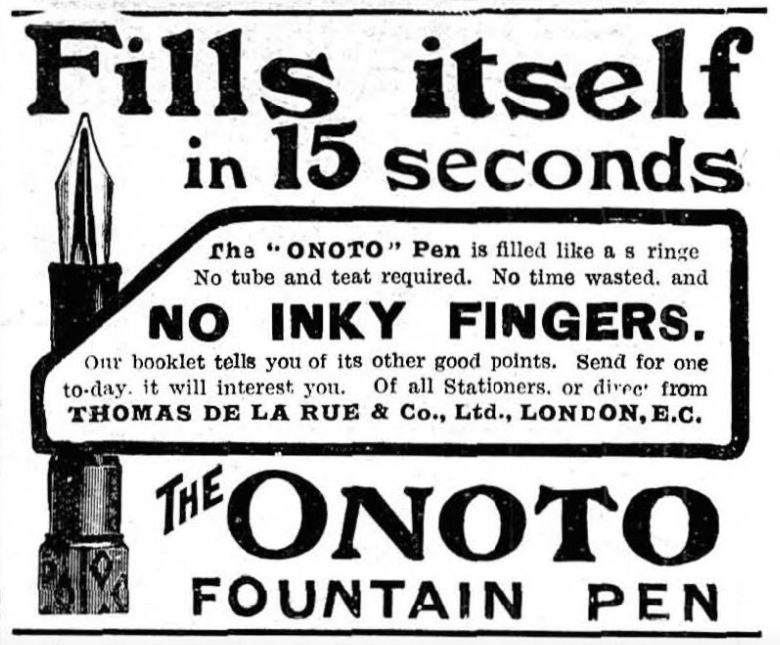
Advertisement from Country Life 23 September 1905

In the autumn of 1905, De La Rue launched a self-filling fountain pen that it guaranteed not to leak because it had a cut-off valve. The writing instrument, which was called the "Onoto Patent Self-filling Pen", also had a patented "plunger filler" system that drew ink into the pen using a vacuum created by the down-stroke of a piston. All pens were handmade in Bunhill Row, London. Very quickly Onoto pens became popular in Great Britain and internationally. Recognition as a global brand was helped by extensive advertising and marketing. The company spent £50,000 (£2.5 million in 2016) on sales marketing and a wide variety of campaigns in Britain, USA, India, Italy and France. By 1909 Onoto pen advertisements were using the red pillar box and a young boy called "Peter Pen". As a result, a US subsidiary, "Onoto Pen Co.", was opened in New York in 1909.

The strong branding of the "Onoto THE Pen", which sold for £10, (about £500 in 2016) was marketed as the "All British Pen" by the time of the First World War. The strength of the Onoto name was successfully added to other products such as stylographs (a fountain pen with a narrow steel tube instead of a conventional nib), pencils, ink and diaries - and other items such as writing paper, playing cards and blotting paper.

In 1915 De La Rue launched the Onoto Valveless. The Onoto ink pencil and the Onoto Safety 'Receder' (with retractable nib) followed in 1921.

=== Growth ===
In 1921 the De La Rue family sold the Thomas De La Rue & Company, Limited to a three-company consortium. Two new Onoto models followed, the Onoto metal-cased pencils in 1922 and the first Onoto lever-filler in 1923. Three year later all pen manufacture was transferred to Fife, Scotland in 1927. Production would continue at a disused paper mill at Strathendry which had been operated by J A Weir, one of the companies involved in the consortium.

=== Inter-war period ===
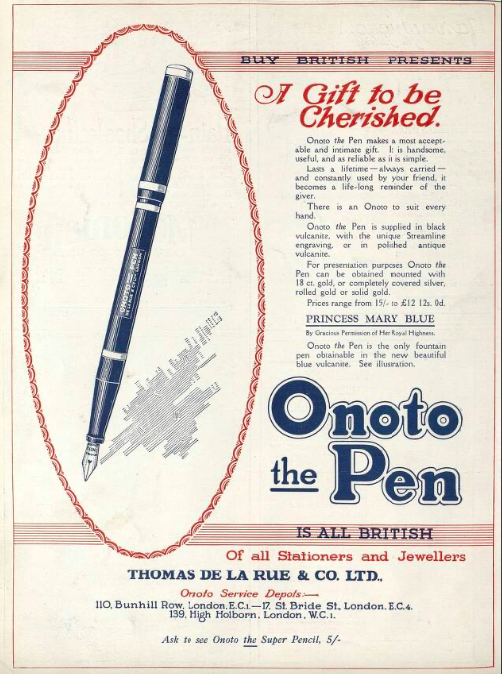
The Princess Mary from the Illustrated Sporting and Dramatic News, 7 November 1925

During the 1930s, and coinciding with both the Great Depression and the Art Deco period, Onoto pens became even more stylish and colourful. New models included streamlined pens with screw caps and ornamental "mounts" were introduced in a wide range of colours. Transparent pens with the ink supply visible became popular. By the mid-1930s premium-priced Onotos with sterling silver and solid gold overlays became highly desirable models.

Throughout this period of new ranges and styles, the basic design of the plunger-filling Onoto pen remained the company's main line. Although it had developed from the original black chased vulcanite model of 1905 into a stylish marbled plastic Onoto by the late 1940s.

Consumers had numerous other plunger-fillers in the Onoto range to choose from, for example, the red-chased Onoto of 1913, the 'Mammoth' Onoto with No.8 nib (1924), the 'Princess Mary' Onoto in powder blue (1925), Onoto ink pencils (1925), coloured plastic Onoto's (1928), Onoto desk sets (1929), visible-ink Onoto's (1935) and the Onoto Magnas (1937). This would be the successor to the over-sized Mammoth Onoto. With a two-tone No 7 nib, the full-sized Magna was available in three distinct colours with either three narrow rolled gold bands or a single wide 14ct band, and soon got a reputation as being one of the best fountain pens ever made.

=== World War II ===
On 11 September 1940, the De La Rue banknote printing works in London was gutted by fire during The Blitz. As a result of the damage, the printing works was moved to Strathendry. This ended much of the high-end artisan pen production in Scotland for the duration of the war. Along with banknotes, the factory also produced the first Supermarine Spitfire seats in laminated plastic along with munitions cases.

Some pen production did continue in the early years of the war when a less expensive version of the Onoto minor was produced along with the Onoto Pelletink pen. Marketed as the new "active service" pen and costing 10s 6d. (equivalent to £25 in 2025) it had a transparent barrel and an integral magazine which held six pellets that could be dissolved in water to provide enough ink to last for a year or more.

=== Post war period and demise ===
After the war, continuing restrictions and rationing meant that full production of pens did not resume until 1947 when a reduced range of Onoto Magna was reintroduced. This included the first lever-filling Magna. These were followed soon afterwards by a series of Onoto lever-fillers in pearl marble colours, the Onoto Ballpen, the Onoto Penmaster ( with metal cap, and semihooded nib) and a small range of Onoto pens with rolled gold overlays.

However, production of most of these models had ceased by February 1955 when the Onoto K series was launched. Available in four models (with matching Onoto pencils) and in four plain colours, the K series had twist-action fillers, hooded nibs, ink-visibility, and the option of heavy rolled gold cap. The adverts promoted "a pen for writing faster, more smoothly for longer". These were the last Onoto pens to be made at Strathendry.

Thomas De La Rue ceased making Onoto Pens at Strathendry on 28 February 1958. In the same year Thomas De La Rue changes its name to De La Rue Company Limited.

== Brand relaunch ==
Since the closure of the original De la Rue factory, there has been a loyal following for Onoto pens among collectors and connoisseurs of fine writing instruments. Many original Onoto pens have resold for many times their original price. In 2003, the Company with its websites, was registered by Mr David Glynn and Dr Jim Marshall, with Arthur Twydle and Stephen Hull as other shareholders. The aim was to re-establish the makers name by producing the 3000 model, with overlays made by Henry Simpole. Only a few prototype pens were made before it became clear that the venture required more serious investment by other parties and in May 2005 a new company named "The Onoto Pen Company Limited" was launched with enthusiastic participation of Mr James Boddy. The significant event held at the London Stock Exchange was attended by the late Sir Brandon Gough, then Chairman of De La Rue plc. The company based in Norwich, seriously restarted the brand making the first new Onoto pens for 46 years.

The first luxury pen unveiled was the Onoto Centenary, weighing 90gms they were made in hallmarked sterling silver with a gilded pocket clip and fitted with an 18crt nib. The fountain pen, with a limited edition of only 500, each individually numbered, celebrated the 100th anniversary of the founding of the original Onoto brand by Thomas De La Rue & Company, Limited. The Centenary was made by Jack Perry, Master Goldsmith, who in his late teens was apprenticed to the French luxury jewellery firm Cartier, at his workshop in Petworth, West Sussex.

Since the Onoto Centenary in 2005, The Onoto Pen Company Limited has released these pens:

- 2006 – The Royal Ballet 75th anniversary pens
- 2006 - The Horatio Nelson Onoto & Emma Hamilton Onoto
- 2007 – The Onoto Magna (vermeil)
- 2007 – The Onoto Excel
- 2008 - The Magna Writer
- 2009 - The Magna 261
- 2009 - The University of Cambridge 800th anniversary pen collection
- 2010 - The Magna Classic range
- 2010 – The University of Cambridge Alumni pen range
- 2010 – The Henry Simpole Overlay Number 1
- 2011 – The Heritage Plunger Filler
- 2011 – The Sir Winston Churchill pen range
- 2011 – The Burlington
- 2012 – The Charles Dickens Range
- 2012 – The Aviator
- 2012 – The Diamond Jubilee
- 2012 – The Magna Plunger Filler
- 2018 – The Pickwick
