= Fountain pen =

Writing implement with nib and internal ink reservoir

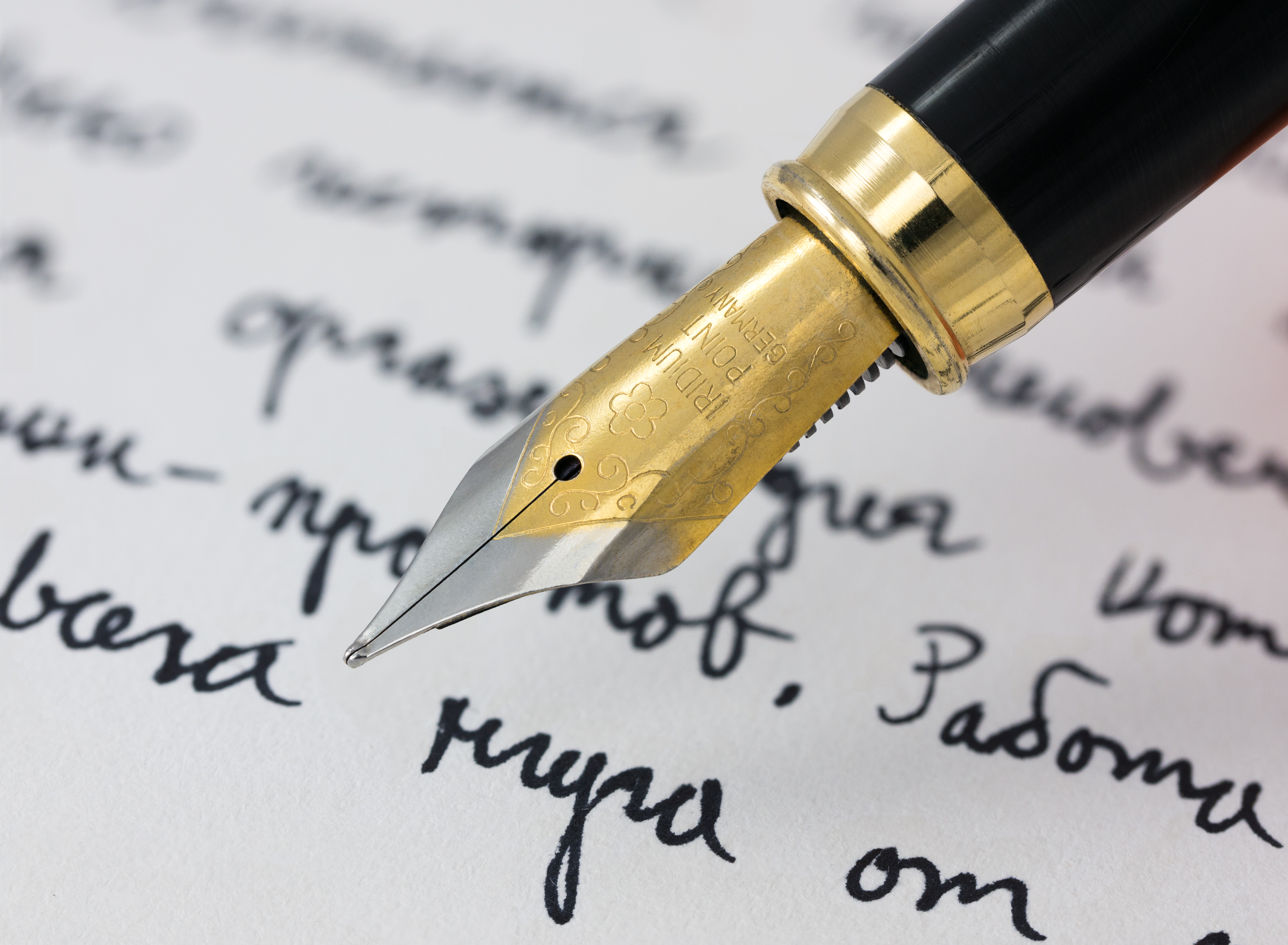
Close-up of traditional fountain pen with an iridium-tipped stainless steel nib

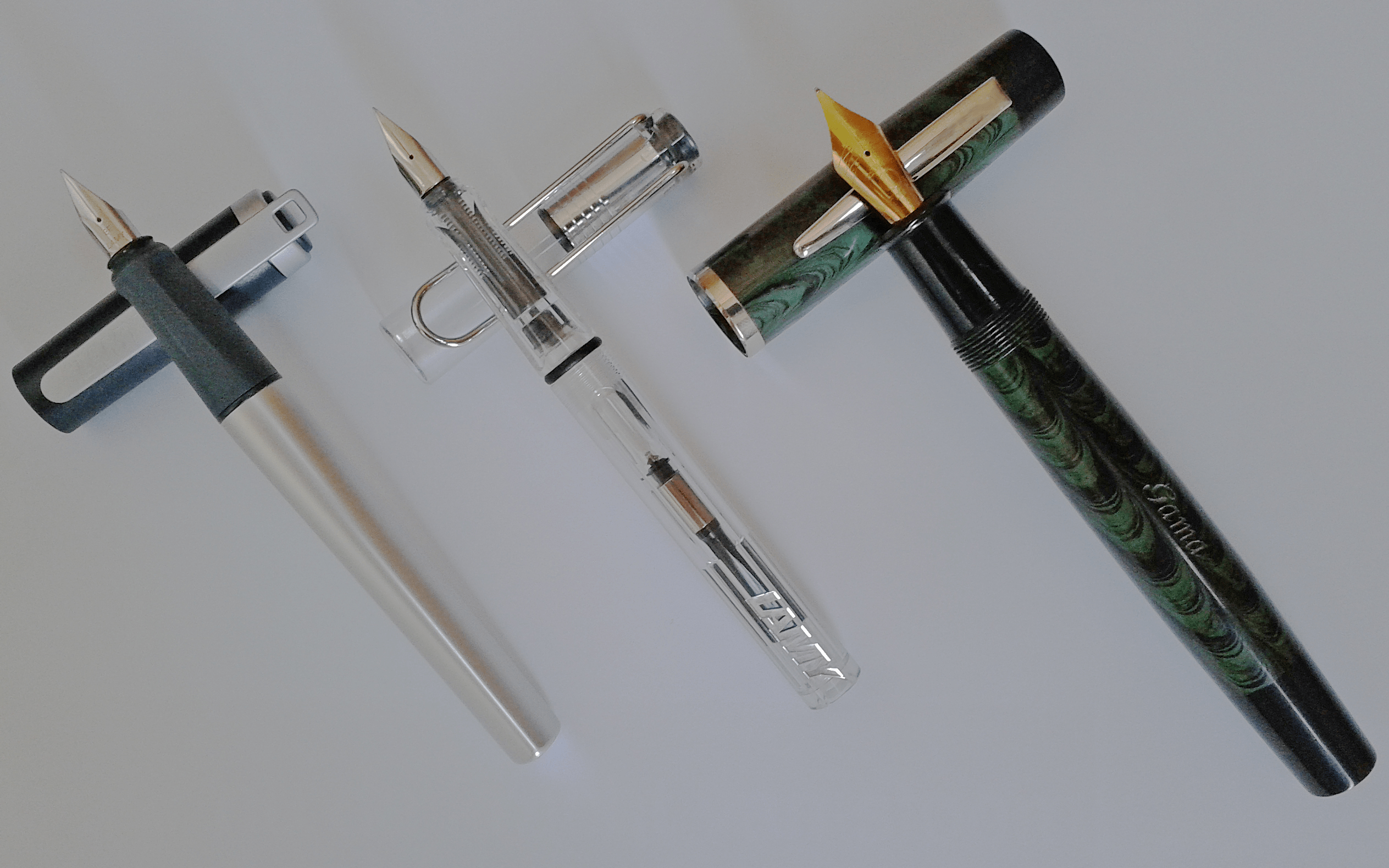
Modern, demonstrator, and traditional fountain pens

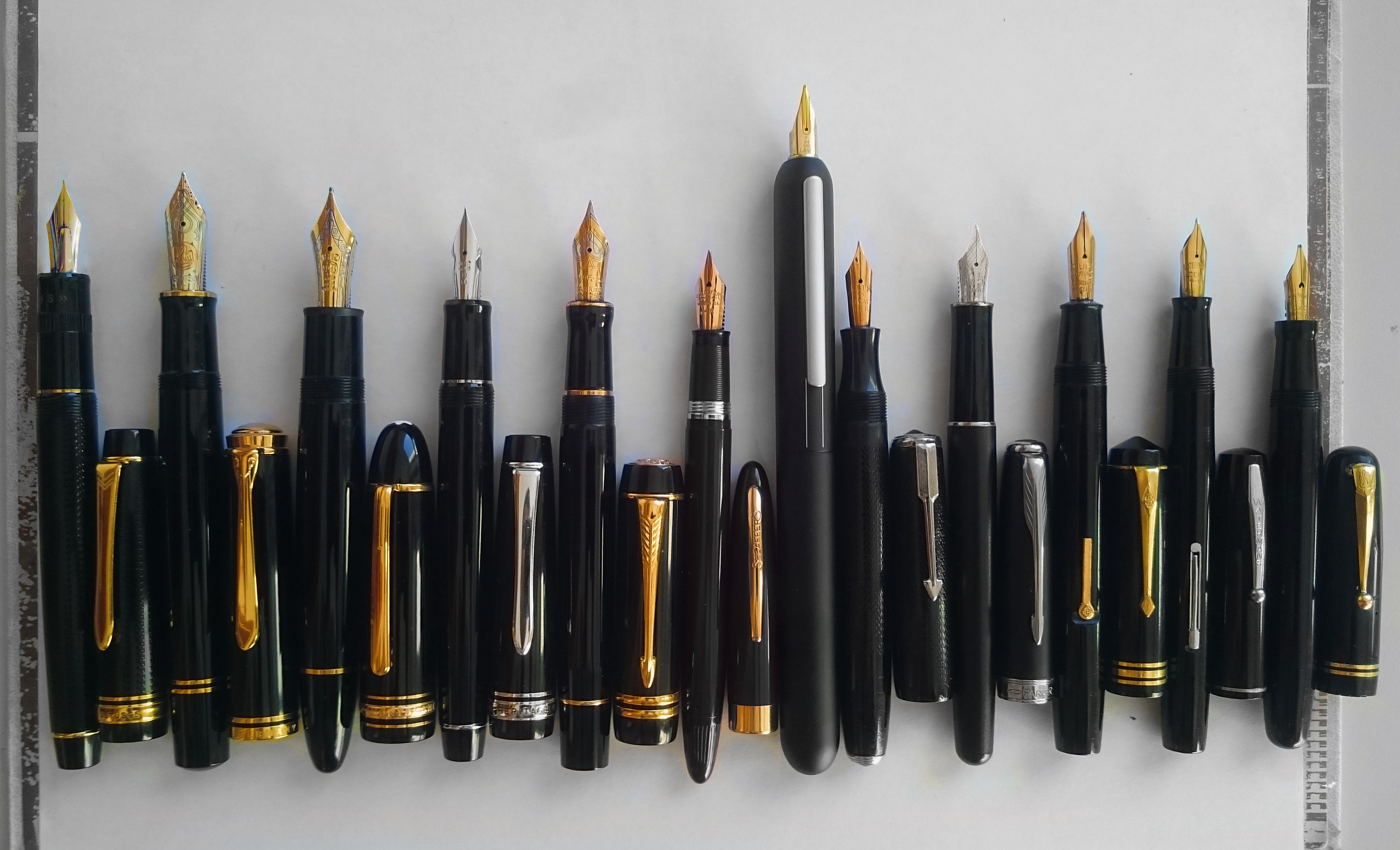
Various contemporary and vintage fountain pens (left to right): Pilot Justus 95; Pelikan Souverän M1000; Montblanc Meisterstück 149; Pilot Heritage 912; Parker Duofold Centennial; Sheaffer Snorkel Admiral; Lamy Dialog 3; Welty; Parker Sonnet; Conway Stewart 55; Waterman Thorobred; Mabie Todd Swan 3220

A fountain pen is a writing instrument that uses a metal nib to apply water-based ink to paper.

It is distinguished from earlier dip pens by using an internal reservoir to hold ink, eliminating the need to repeatedly dip the pen in an inkwell during use. The pen draws ink from the reservoir through a feed to the nib and deposits the ink on paper via a combination of gravity and capillary action. Filling the reservoir with ink may be achieved manually, via the use of an eyedropper or syringe, or via an internal filling mechanism that creates suction (for example, through a piston mechanism) or a vacuum to transfer ink directly through the nib into the reservoir. Some pens employ removable reservoirs in the form of pre-filled ink cartridges or ink converters.

== History ==
=== Early prototypes of reservoir pens ===
According to Qadi al-Nu'man al-Tamimi (d. 974) in his Kitab al-Majalis wa 'l-musayarat, the Fatimid caliph Al-Mu'izz li-Din Allah (reigned 953–975) in Arab Egypt demanded a pen that would not stain his hands or clothes, and was provided with a pen that held ink in a reservoir, allowing it to be held upside-down without leaking.

There is compelling evidence that a working fountain pen was constructed and used during the Renaissance by artist and inventor Leonardo da Vinci. Leonardo's journals contain drawings with cross-sections of what appears to be a reservoir pen that works by both gravity and capillary action. Historians also took note of the fact that the handwriting in the inventor's surviving journals is of a consistent contrast throughout, rather than exhibiting the characteristic fading pattern typical of a quill pen caused by expending and re-dipping. While no physical item survives, several working models were reconstructed in 2011 by artist Amerigo Bombara that have since been put on display in museums dedicated to Leonardo.

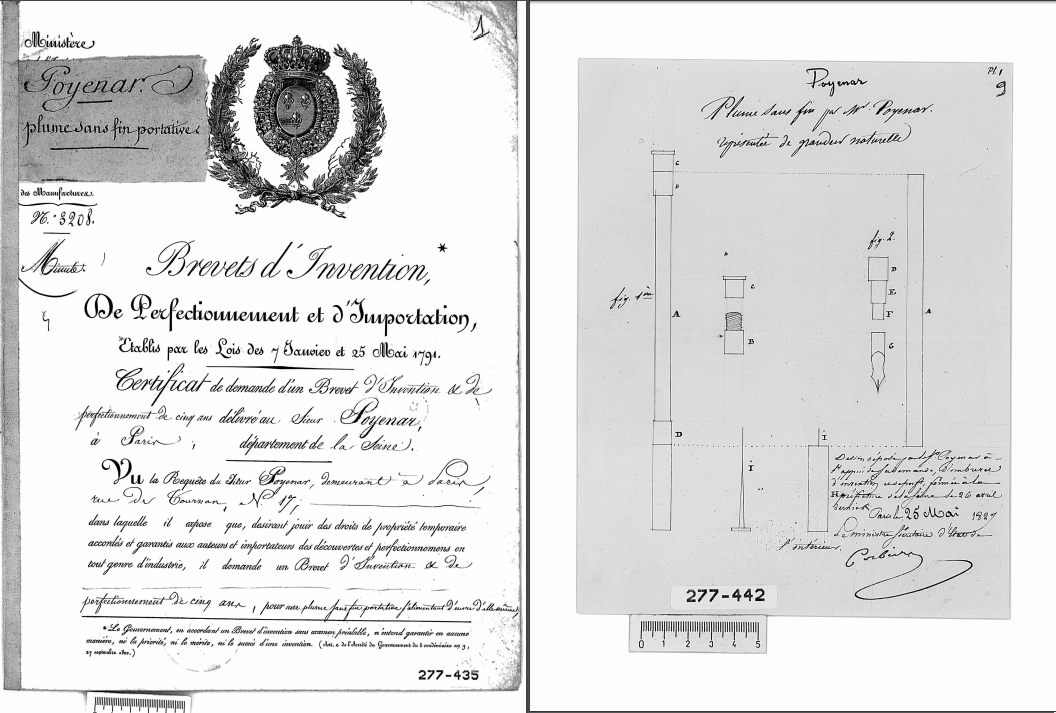
An early fountain pen patent awarded by the French Government to the Romanian inventor Petrache Poenaru on 25 May 1827

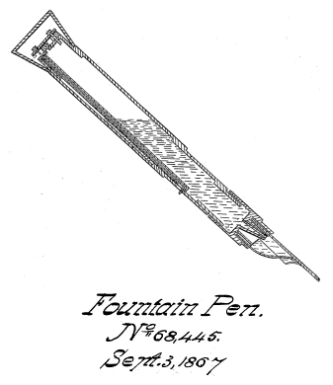
M. Klein and Henry W. Wynne received U.S. patent 68,445 in 1867 for an ink chamber and delivery system in the handle of the fountain pen

=== European reservoir models ===
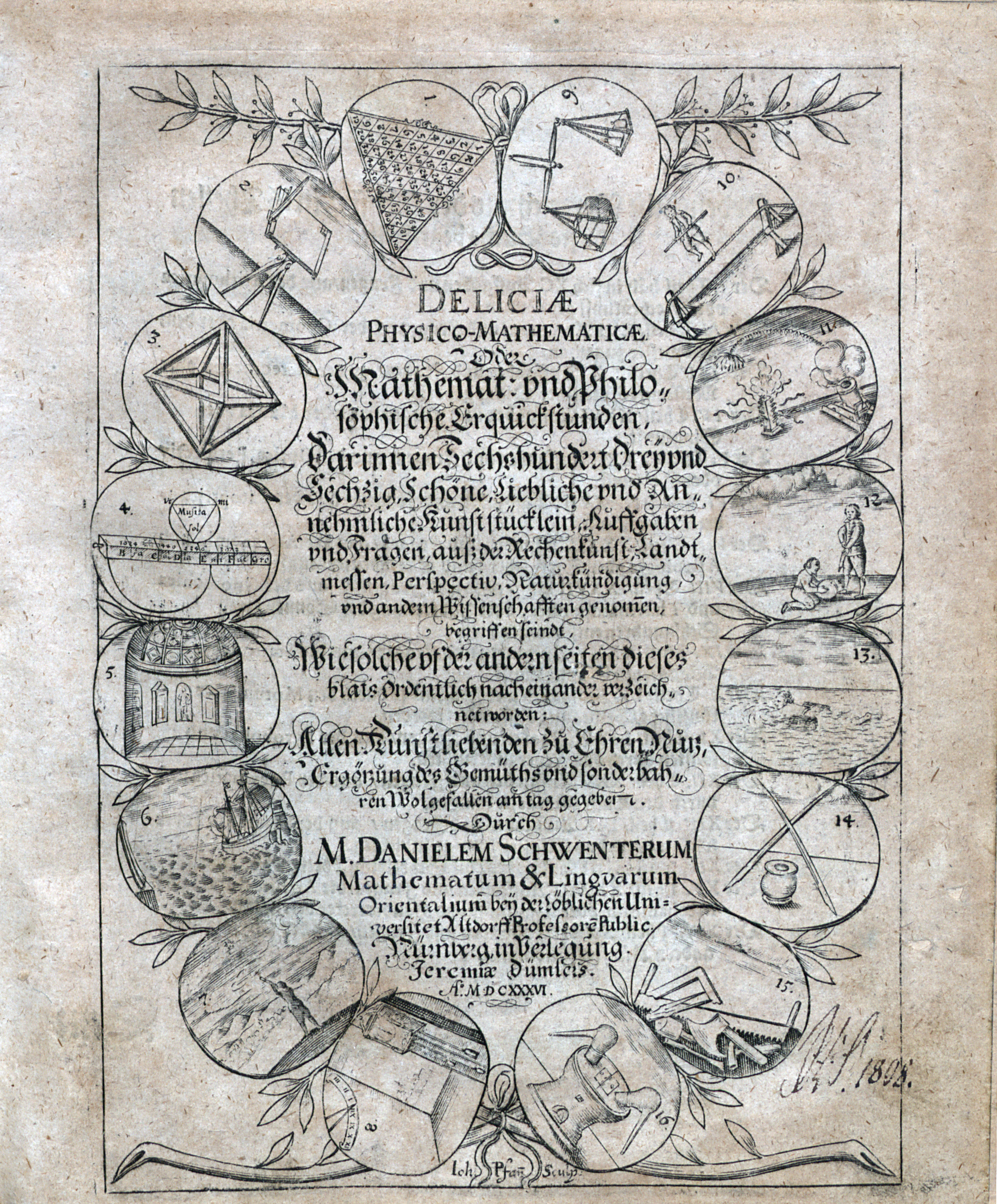
Deliciæ physico-mathematicæ, 1636

The fountain pen was available in Europe in the 17th century and is shown by contemporary references. In Deliciæ Physico-Mathematicæ (a 1636 magazine), German inventor Daniel Schwenter described a pen made from two quills. One quill served as a reservoir for ink inside the other quill. The ink was sealed inside the quill with cork. Ink was squeezed through a small hole to the writing point. In 1663, the diarist Samuel Pepys wrote to have been given a silver pen "to carry inke in". Noted Maryland historian Hester Dorsey Richardson (1862–1933) documented a reference to "three silver fountain pens, worth 15 shillings" in England during the reign of Charles II, c. 1649–1685. By the early 18th century such pens were already commonly known as "fountain pens". Hester Dorsey Richardson also found a 1734 notation made by Robert Morris the elder in the ledger of the expenses of Robert Morris the younger, who was at the time in Philadelphia, for "one fountain pen". Perhaps the best-known reference, however, is that of Nicholas Bion (1652–1733), whose illustrated description of a "plume sans fin" was published in 1709 in his treatise published in English in 1723 as "The Construction and Principal Uses of Mathematical Instruments". The earliest datable pen of the form described by Bion is inscribed 1702, while other examples bear French hallmarks as late as the early 19th century.

=== First patents ===
Progress in developing a reliable pen was slow until the mid-19th century because of an imperfect understanding of the role that air pressure plays in the operation of pens. Furthermore, most inks were highly corrosive and full of sedimentary inclusions. The first English patent for a fountain pen was issued in May 1809 to Frederick Fölsch, with a patent covering (among other things) an improved fountain pen feed issued to Joseph Bramah in September 1809. John Scheffer's patent of 1819 was the first design to see commercial success, with a number of surviving examples of his "Penographic" known. Another noteworthy pioneer design was John Jacob Parker's, patented in 1832 – a self-filler with a screw-operated piston. The Romanian inventor Petrache Poenaru received a French patent on 25 May 1827, for the invention of a fountain pen with a barrel made from a large swan quill.

=== Mass-manufactured nibs ===
In 1828, Josiah Mason improved a cheap and efficient slip-in nib in Birmingham, England, which could be added to a fountain pen. In 1830, with the invention of a new machine, William Joseph Gillott, William Mitchell, and James Stephen Perry devised a way to mass manufacture robust, cheap steel pen nibs (Perry & Co.). This boosted the Birmingham pen trade and by the 1850s, more than half the steel-nib pens manufactured in the world were made in Birmingham. Thousands of skilled craftsmen were employed in the industry. Many new manufacturing techniques were perfected, enabling the city's factories to mass-produce their pens cheaply and efficiently. These were sold worldwide to many who previously could not afford to write, thus encouraging the development of education and literacy.

=== New patents and inventions ===
In 1848, American inventor Azel Storrs Lyman patented a pen with "a combined holder and nib". In 1849 Scottish inventor Robert William Thomson invented the refillable fountain pen. From the 1850s, there was a steadily accelerating stream of fountain pen patents and pens in production. However, it was only after three key inventions were in place that the fountain pen became a widely popular writing instrument. Those were the iridium-tipped gold nib, hard rubber, and free-flowing ink.

Waterman 42 Safety Pen, with variation in materials (both red and black hard vulcanized rubbers or ebonite) and retracting nibs

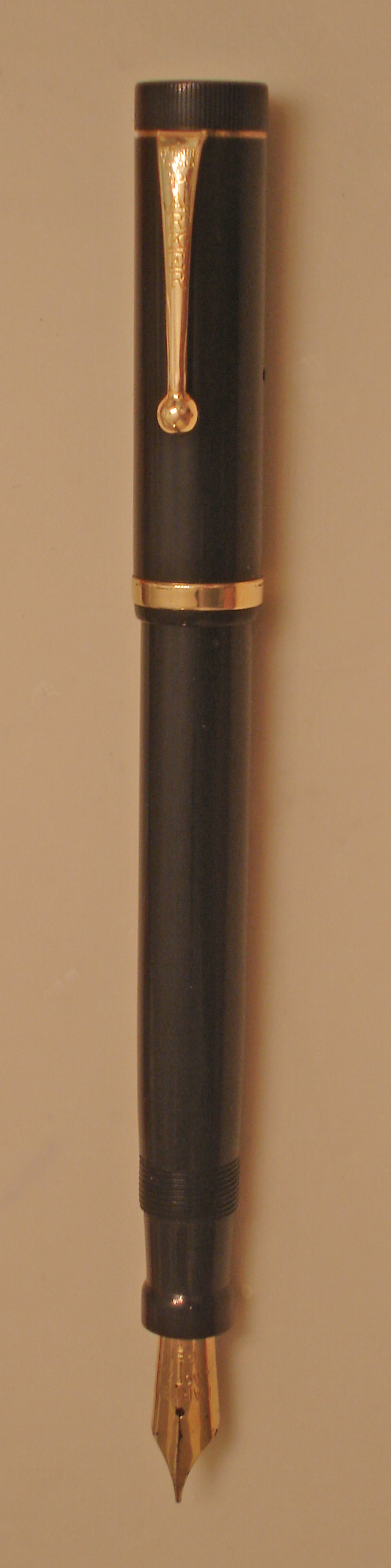
Parker Duofold, c. 1924

The first fountain pens making use of all these key ingredients appeared in the 1850s. In the 1870s Duncan MacKinnon, a Canadian living in New York City, and Alonzo T. Cross of Providence, Rhode Island, created stylographic pens with a hollow, tubular nib and a wire acting as a valve. Stylographic pens are now used mostly for drafting and technical drawing but were very popular in the decade beginning in 1875. In the 1880s the era of the mass-produced fountain pen finally began. The dominant American producers in this pioneer era were Waterman, of New York City, and Wirt, based in Bloomsburg, Pennsylvania. Waterman soon outstripped Wirt, along with many companies that sprang up to fill the new and growing fountain pen market. Waterman remained the market leader until the early 1920s.

At this time, fountain pens were almost all filled by unscrewing a portion of the hollow barrel or holder and inserting the ink by means of a dropper – a slow and messy procedure. Pens also tended to leak inside their caps and at the joint where the barrel opened for filling. Now that the materials' problems had been overcome and the flow of ink while writing had been regulated, the next problems to be solved were the creation of a simple, convenient self-filler and the problem of leakage. Self-fillers began to gain in popularity around the turn of the century; the most successful of these was probably the Conklin crescent-filler, followed by A. A. Waterman's twist-filler. The tipping point, however, was the runaway success of Walter A. Sheaffer's lever-filler, introduced in 1912, paralleled by Parker's roughly contemporary button-filler.

=== Pen leakage ===
Meanwhile, many inventors turned their attention to the problem of leakage. Some of the earliest solutions to this problem came in the form of a "safety" pen with a retractable point that allowed the ink reservoir to be corked like a bottle. Horton, Moore, and Caw's were the earliest makers of such pens, all starting in the 1890s.

In 1898, George Safford Parker released the Parker Jointless, so named because its barrel was single-piece with no section joint to leak and stain the writer's fingers. The nib and feed assembly fit into the barrel's end like a cork stopper.

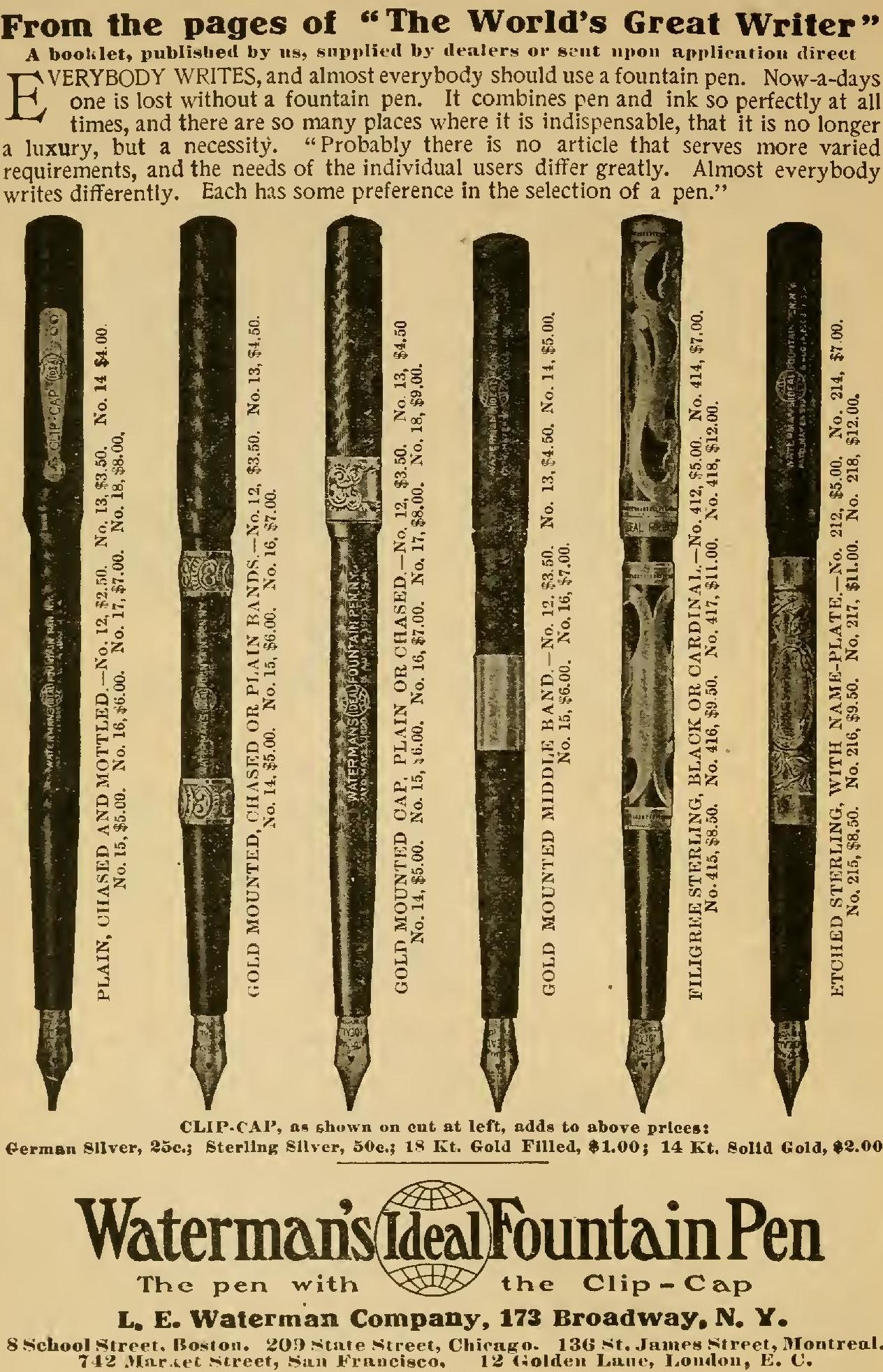
"Waterman's ideal fountain pen" 1908 ad

In 1908, Waterman began marketing a popular safety pen of its own. For pens with non-retractable nibs, the adoption of screw-on caps with inner caps that sealed around the nib by bearing against the front of the section effectively solved the leakage problem (such pens were also marketed as "safety pens", as with the Parker Jack-Knife Safety and the Swan Safety Screw-Cap).

=== Further innovation ===
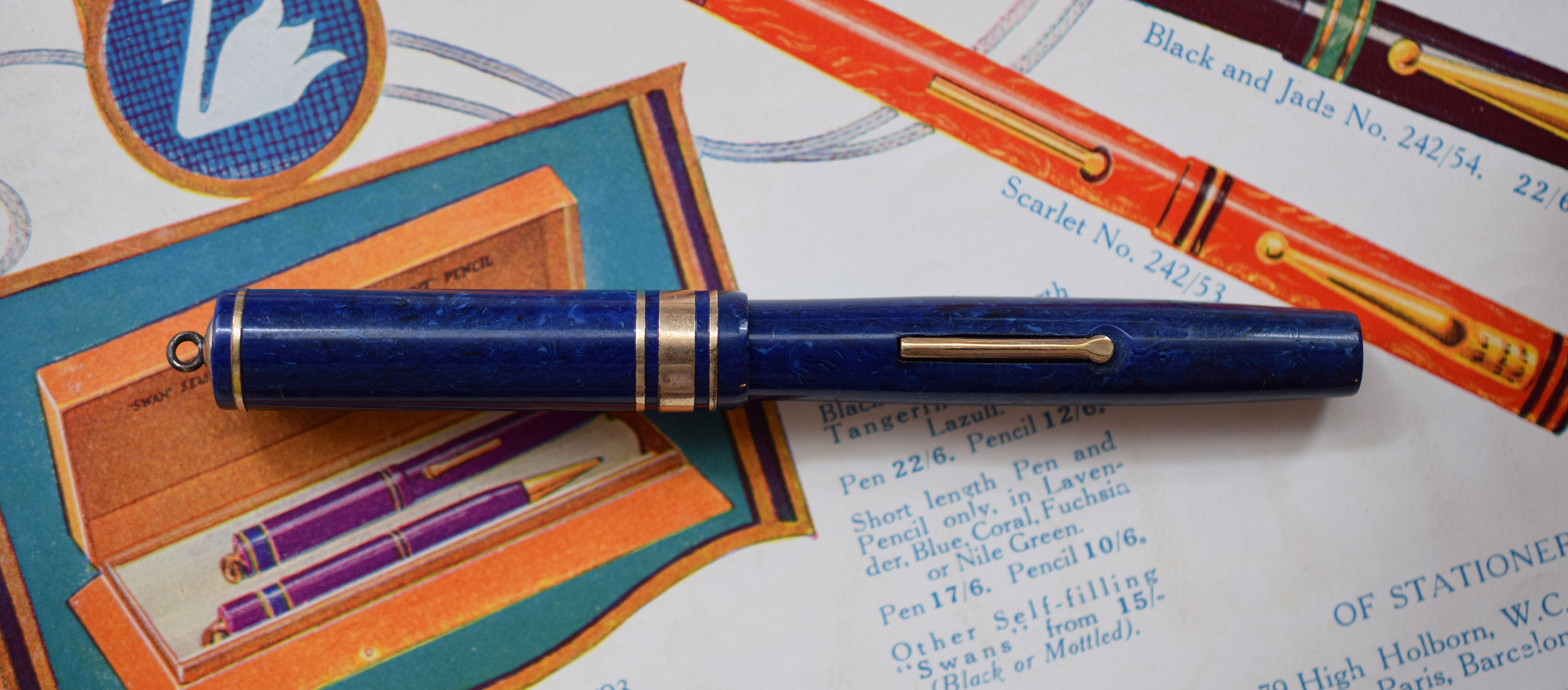
Lever filler pen made of celluloid by Mabie Todd & Co. New York (1927)

In Europe, the German office supplies company Gunther Wagner, founded in 1838, introduced their Pelikan in 1929, the first modern screw piston-filling fountain pen. This was based upon the acquisition of patents for solid-ink fountain pens from the factory of Slavoljub Penkala from Croatia (patented 1907, in mass production since 1911), and the patent of the Hungarian Theodor Kovacs for the modern piston filler by 1925.

The decades that followed saw many technological innovations in the manufacture of fountain pens. Celluloid gradually replaced hard rubber, which enabled production in a much wider range of colors and designs. At the same time, manufacturers experimented with new filling systems. The inter-war period saw the introduction of some of the most notable models, such as the Parker Duofold and Vacumatic, Sheaffer's Lifetime Balance series, and the Pelikan 100.

During the 1940s and 1950s, fountain pens retained their dominance: early ballpoint pens were expensive, were prone to leaks and had irregular inkflow, while the fountain pen continued to benefit from the combination of mass production and craftsmanship. (Bíró's patent, and other early patents on ball-point pens often used the term "ball-point fountain pen," because at the time the ball-point pen was considered a type of fountain pen; that is, a pen that held ink in an enclosed reservoir.) This period saw the launch of innovative models such as the Parker 51, the Aurora 88, the Sheaffer Snorkel, and the Eversharp Skyline, while the Esterbrook J series of lever-fill models with interchangeable steel nibs offered inexpensive reliability to the masses.

=== Popular usage ===
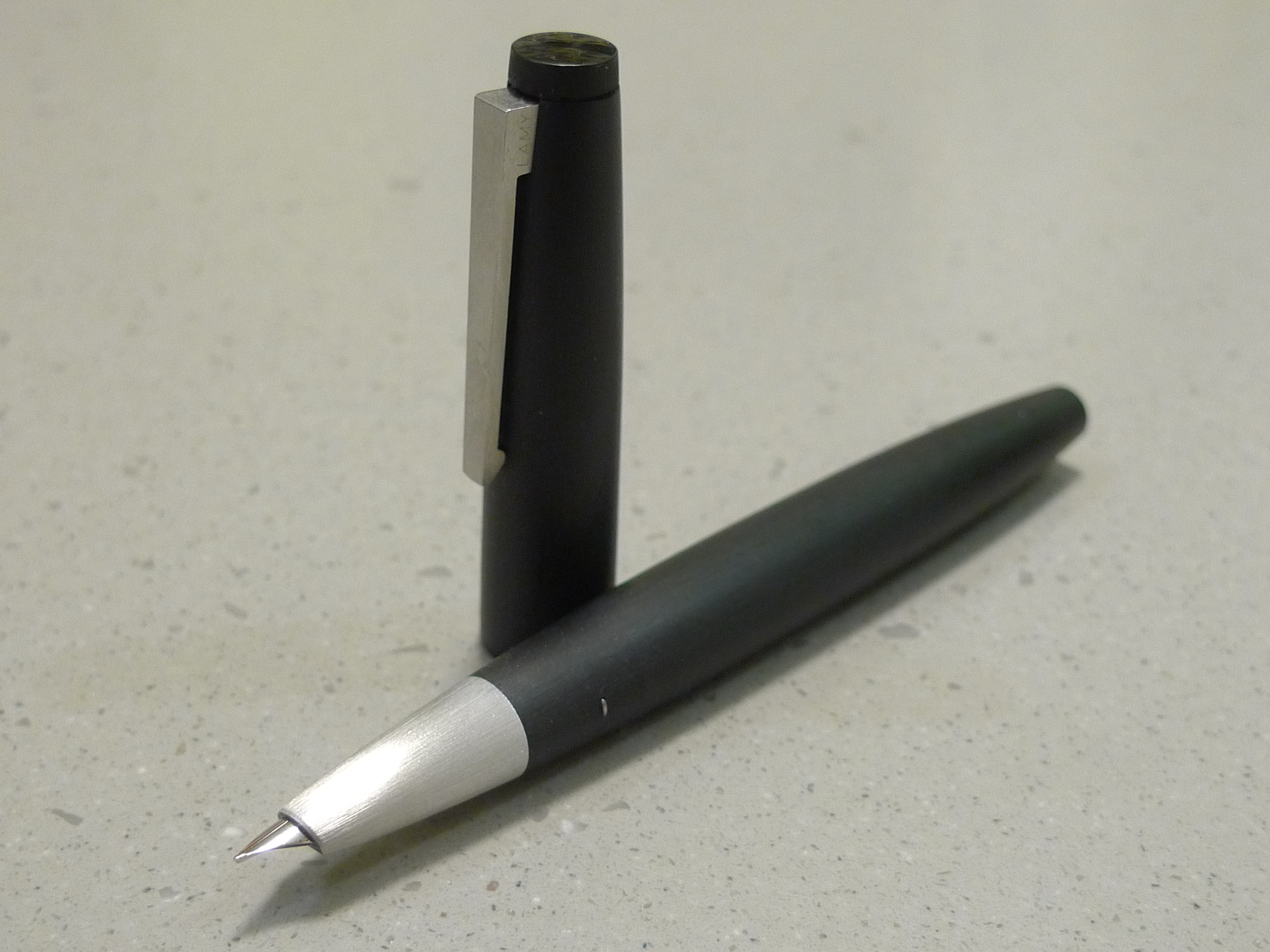
Lamy 2000 piston filler made of polycarbonate and stainless steel, launched in 1966 and still in production

By the 1960s, refinements in ballpoint pen production gradually ensured its dominance over the fountain pen for casual use. Although cartridge-filler fountain pens are still in common use in France, Italy, Germany, Austria, India, and the United Kingdom, and are widely used by young students in most private schools in England, at least one private school in Scotland, and public elementary schools in Germany. A few modern manufacturers now depict the fountain pen as a collectible item or a status symbol, rather than an everyday writing tool (such companies include Conway Stewart, Montblanc, Graf von Faber-Castell, and Visconti) . Fountain pens maintain a base of devoted users who view them as superior writing instruments due to their relative smoothness and versatility. Retailers continue to sell fountain pens and inks for casual and calligraphic use. During the 2010s, fountain pens have made a resurgence, with some retailers, such as Goulet Pens, saying it is because of renewed consumer interest in analog products. This popularity has led to a new wave of casual use fountain pens and custom ink manufacturers, who utilize online stores to easily sell fountain pens to a wider audience.

== Feed ==
The feed of a fountain pen is the component that connects the nib of the pen with its ink reservoir. It not only allows the ink to flow to the nib (in what is often described as a "controlled leak") but also regulates the amount of air flowing backwards up to the reservoir to replace this lost ink.

The feed uses a series of narrow channels or "fissures" that run down its lower edge. As ink flows down these fissures, air is simultaneously allowed to flow upwards into the reservoir in an even exchange of volumes. The feed allows ink to flow when the pen is being put to paper but ensures ink does not flow when the pen is not in use. The feed makes use of capillary action; this is noticeable when a pen is refilled with a brightly coloured ink. The ink is taken up and into the feed by way of capillary action (and is often visible in clear demonstrator pens), but is not dispensed onto the paper until the nib makes contact.

How the feed is shaped may determine the wetness and flow of a particular pen. For this reason, feed material alone and its surface roughness may have a significant effect on the way two pens of the same nib size write.

Pen feeds are crucial to preventing ink from dripping or leaking. Feeds often feature finned structures intended for buffering fountain pen ink. Buffering is the capacity to catch and temporarily hold an overflow of ink, caused by conditions other than writing. When a fountain pen nib receives such an overflow it will result in ink blobbing or dripping also known as burping. A pen with a misconfigured feed might fail to deposit any ink whatsoever.

=== Fiber feeds ===
Some fountain pens use a fiber wick (known as a wick feed) underneath the nib. They often have a plastic part that looks like a feed that is only used to hold the fiber wick in place and does not assist with ink flow. It uses capillary action, since the wick pulls the ink down the feed. The fiber feeds offer plenty of ink flow and can stay wet for extended periods. Cleaning fiber feed pens can require longer soaking in water.

== Nibs ==
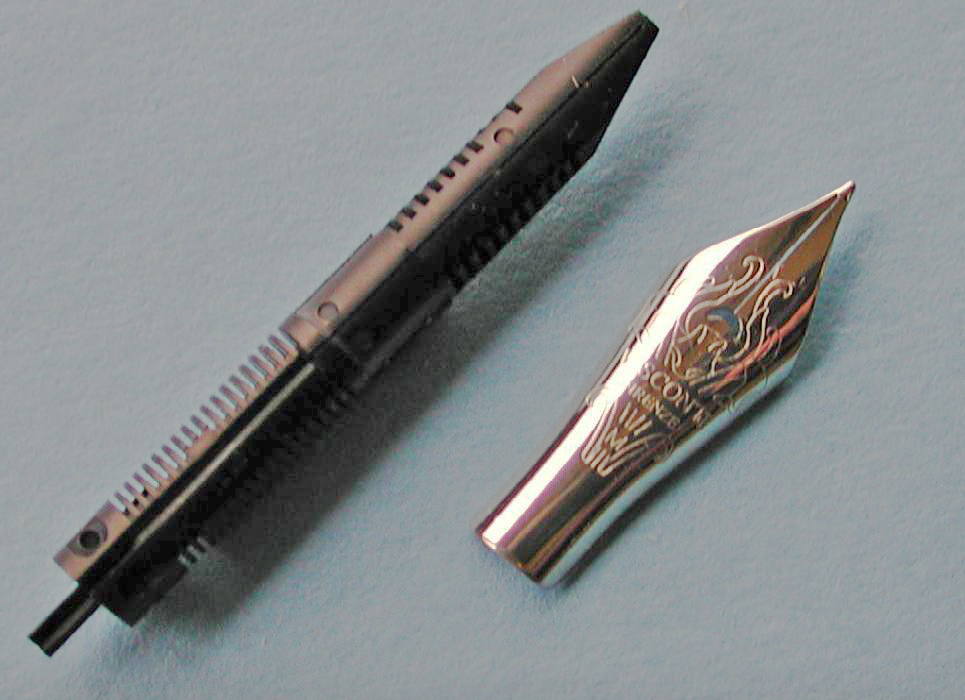
Detail of a Visconti stainless steel nib and feed with a finned ink buffering structure at its rear half

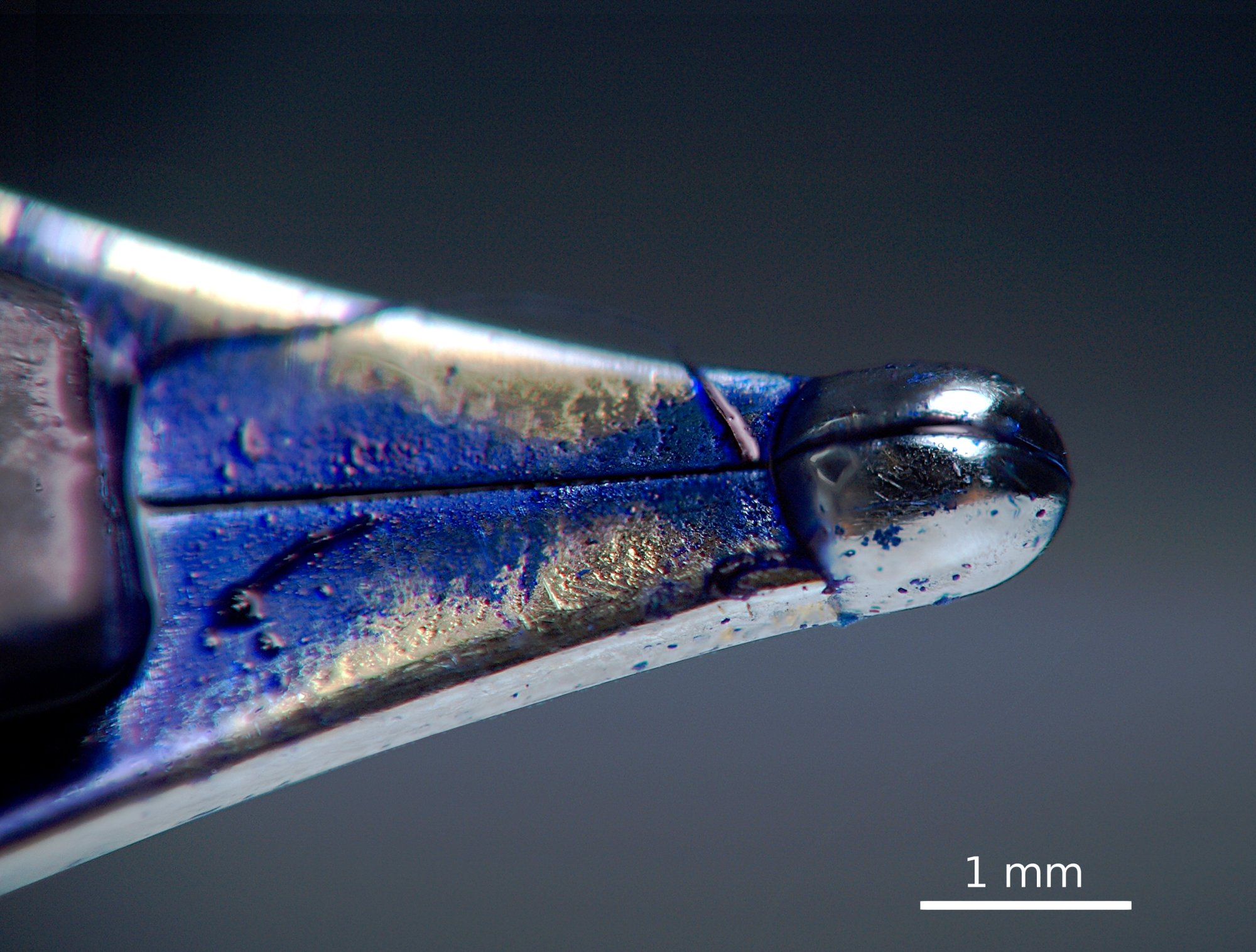
Tip of a fountain pen nib

The modern fountain pen nib is a direct descendant of the iridium-tipped gold dip pen nibs of the 19th century. The earliest attempts at adding a hard and long-wearing tipping material to a gold nib utilized materials such as ruby. A more successful approach exploited the discovery of the platinum group of metals, including ruthenium, osmium, and iridium. From the mid-1830s gold dip pen nibs tipped with iridium were produced in rapidly increasing quantities, first in England and soon thereafter in the United States. The first mass-produced fountain pens used gold nibs sourced from established makers of gold dip pen nibs, some of the most prominent being Mabie Todd, Fairchild, and Aikin Lambert. Today, nibs are usually made of stainless steel or gold, with the most popular gold alloys being 14 carat (58 1/3%) and 18 carat (75%). Titanium is a less common metal used for making nibs. Gold is considered the optimum metal for its flexibility and its resistance to corrosion, although gold's corrosion resistance is less of an issue than in the past because of better stainless steel alloys and less corrosive inks. Palladium alloys have been used occasionally in the past, usually as a money-saving alternative to white gold. As long as palladium remains more valuable than gold, however, it is unlikely to see much use for nib manufacture.

=== Nib plating ===
Further gold plating provides favorable wettability, which is the ability of a solid surface to reduce the surface tension of a liquid in contact with it such that it spreads over the surface.

=== Nib tipping ===
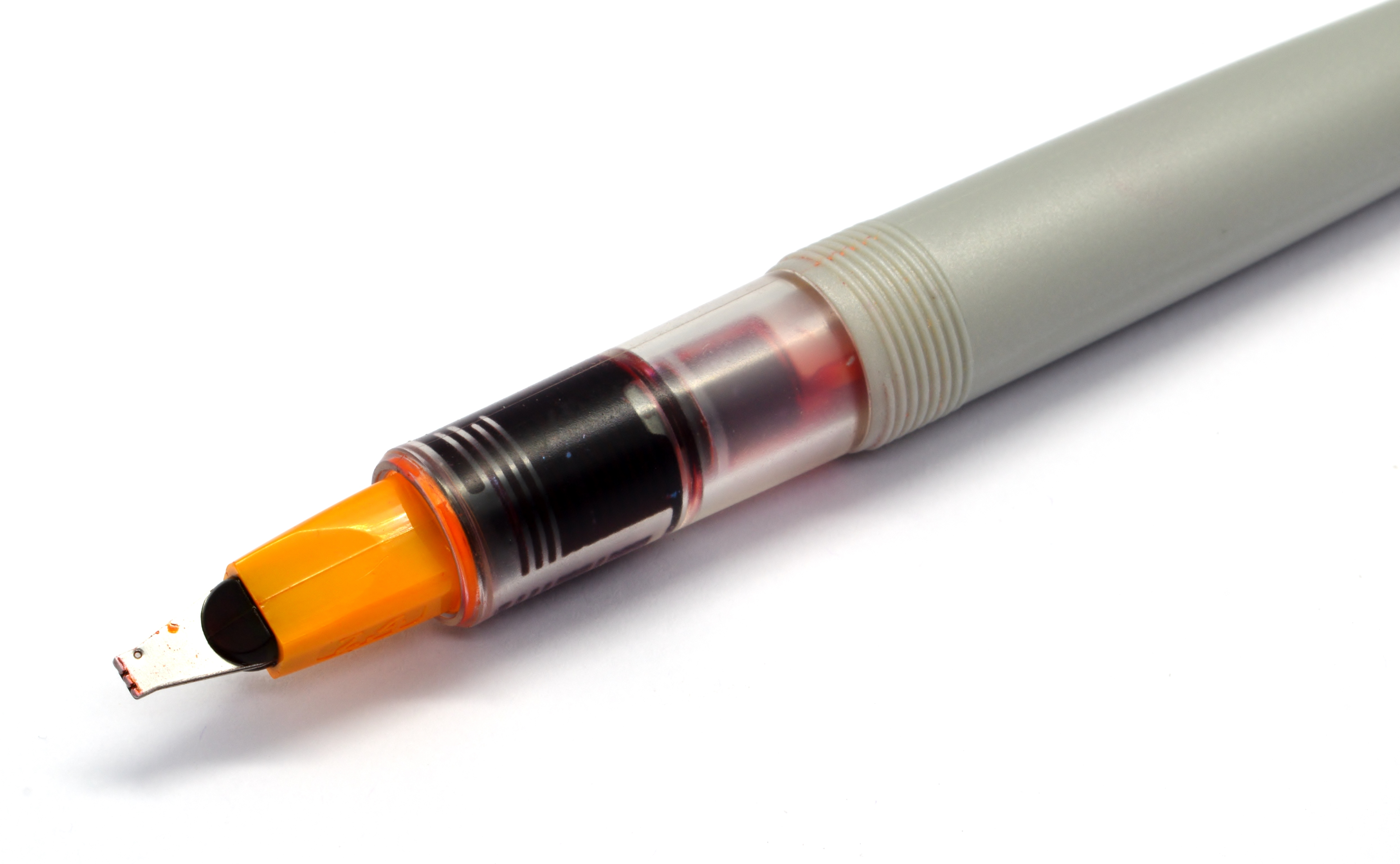
The Pilot Parallel, an example of a type of an italic nib used in fountain pens, often used to create art and calligraphy. This pen has two flat plates that meet in the center in place of a traditional nib.

Gold and most steel and titanium nibs are tipped with a hard, wear-resistant alloy that typically includes metals from the platinum group. These metals share qualities of extreme hardness and corrosion resistance. The tipping material is often called "iridium", but few if any nib manufacturers have used tipping alloys containing iridium since the mid-1950s. The metals osmium, rhenium, ruthenium, and tungsten are used instead, generally as an alloy, produced as tiny pellets which are welded onto the nib's tip prior to cutting the nib slit and grinding the tip into its final shape. Untipped steel and titanium points will wear more rapidly due to abrasion by the paper.

=== Capillary action ===
The nib usually has a tapering or parallel slit cut down its centre, to convey the ink down the nib by capillary action, as well as a "breather hole" of varying shape. The breather hole's intended function is to allow air exchange with the ink reservoir through the channels of the feed, though some modern authorities believe this is a misconception and such venting is unnecessary. Some fountain pens come without a breather hole such as the Camlin Trinity, Monami Olika, Pelikan Pelikano, and Platinum Preppy. The breather hole's other main function is to provide an endpoint to the nib slit and an indexing point for slit cutting. The breather hole also acts as a stress relieving point, preventing the nib from cracking longitudinally from the end of the slit as a result of repeated flexing during use.

The nib narrows to a point where the ink is transferred to the paper. Extremely broad calligraphy pens may have several slits in the nib to increase ink flow and help distribute it evenly across the point, but such designs are more commonly found on dip pens. Nibs divided into three 'tines' are commonly known as music nibs. This is because their line, which can be varied from broad to fine, is suited for writing musical scores.

=== Types of nibs ===
Although the most common nibs end in a round point of various sizes (extra fine, fine, medium, broad), various other nib shapes are available. Examples of this are double broad, music, oblique, reverse oblique, stub, italic, and 360-degree nibs.

Broader nibs are used for less precise emphasis, with the benefit of a greater level of ink shading, a property wherein ink pools in parts of a stroke to cause variations in color or sheen – where dyes in ink crystallize on a page instead of absorbing into the paper, which leads to a different color being seen on less absorbent paper due to thin film interference. Finer nibs (e.g. extra fine and fine) may be used for intricate corrections and alterations, at the expense of shading and sheen. Oblique, reverse oblique, stub, and italic nibs may be used for calligraphic purposes or for general handwritten compositions. The line width of a particular nib may vary based on its country of origin; Japanese nibs are often thinner in general.

=== Nib flexibility ===
Flexibility is a function of several factors. One is the nib material's resilience; another is its thickness. Finally there is the nib's shape, with longer tines offering more flexibility than short tines, while greater curvature increases stiffness. Contrary to common belief, material alone does not determine a nib's flexibility. Gold alloys of greater purity (18K, or 750/1000 gold) will on average be softer and less springy than alloys of lower purity (14K, or 585/1000 gold), but whatever the alloy its resilience can be altered considerably in manufacture by means of controlled work-hardening.

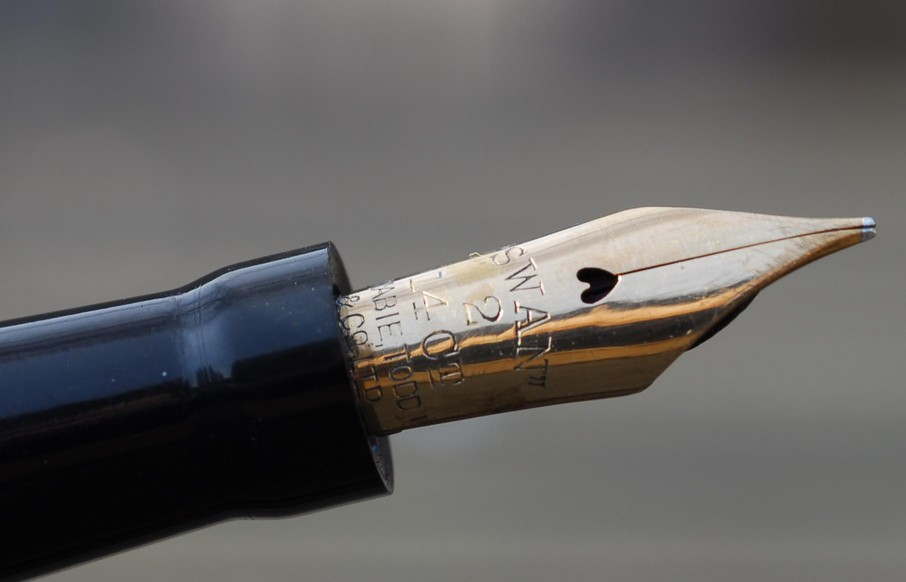
Mabie Todd Swan flexible 14k nib

Fountain pens dating from the first half of the 20th century are more likely to have flexible nibs, suited to the favored handwriting styles of the period (e.g. Copperplate script and Spencerian script). By the 1940s, writing preferences had shifted towards stiffer nibs that could withstand the greater pressure required for writing through carbon paper to create duplicate documents.

Furthermore, competition between the major pen brands such as Parker and Waterman, and the introduction of lifetime guarantees, meant that flexible nibs could no longer be supported profitably. In countries where this rivalry was not present to the same degree, such as the UK and Germany, flexible nibs are more common.

Nowadays, stiff nibs are the norm as people exchange between fountain pens and other writing modes. These more closely emulate the ballpoint pens most modern writers are experienced with. Despite being rigid and firm, the idea that steel nibs write "horribly" is a misconception. More flexible nibs can be easily damaged if excessive pressure is applied to them. Ideally, a fountain pen's nib glides across the paper using the ink as a lubricant, and writing requires no pressure.

Good quality nibs that have been used appropriately are long lasting, often lasting longer than the lifetime of the original owner. Many vintage pens with decades-old nibs can still be used today.

Hooded nib of a Hero pen

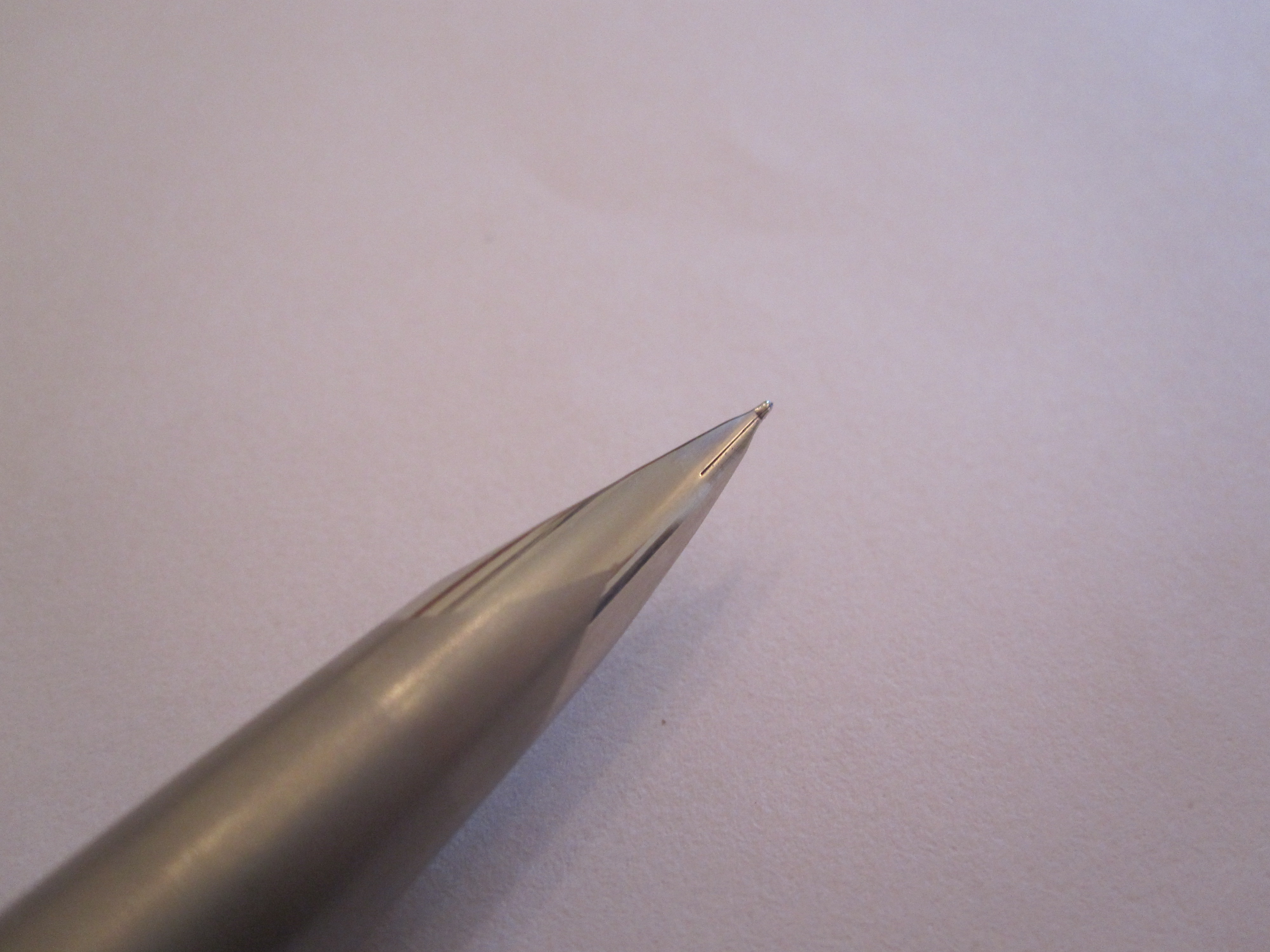
The Integral Nib of a Parker 50 (Falcon)

=== Different nib styles ===
Other styles of fountain pen nibs include hooded (e.g. Parker 51, Parker 61, 2007 Parker 100, Lamy 2000, and Hero 329), inlaid (e.g. Sheaffer Targa or Sheaffer P.F.M) or integral Nib (Parker T-1, Falcon, and Pilot Myu 701).

Users are often cautioned not to lend or borrow fountain pens as the nib "wears in" at an angle unique to each individual person. A different user is likely to find that a worn-in nib does not write satisfactorily in their hand and, furthermore, creates a second wear surface, ruining the nib for the original user. This, however, is not a point of concern in pens with modern, durable tipping material, as these pens take many years to develop any significant wear.

== Filling mechanisms ==
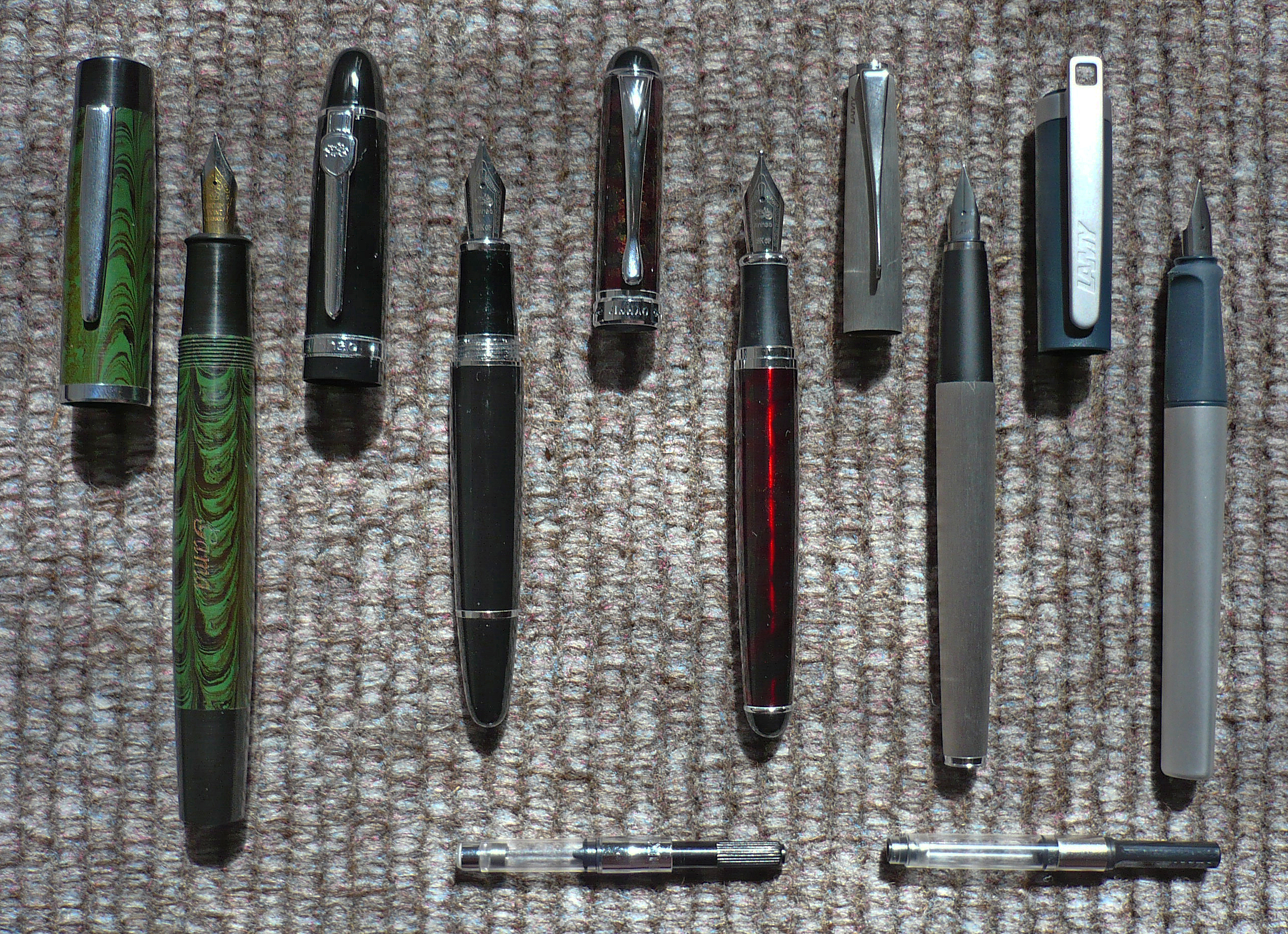
Left to Right: Gama Supreme eyedropper, Jinhao 159, and X750 using international standard converters or ink cartridges and Lamy Studio stainless and Nexx M using proprietary Lamy converters or ink cartridges

A squeeze filler by Hero

=== Eyedropper filler ===
The reservoirs of the earliest fountain pens were mostly filled by eyedropper ("dropper" was the term used at the time). This could be messy, spurring development of so-called "self-filling" pens equipped with internal filling mechanisms. Though self-fillers had largely displaced dropper-fillers by the 1920s, they never went out of production, and there has been a revival of interest in recent years. For some, the simplicity, reliability, and large ink capacity of the dropper-filler provide ample compensation for its inconveniences.

After the eyedropper-filler era came the first generation of mass-produced self-fillers, almost all using a rubber sac to hold the ink. The sac was compressed and then released by various mechanisms to fill the pen.

=== Self-filling designs ===
The Conklin crescent filler, introduced c. 1901, was one of the first mass-produced self-filling pen designs. The crescent-filling system employs an arch-shaped crescent attached to a rigid metal pressure bar, with the crescent portion protruding from the pen through a slot and the pressure bar inside the barrel. A second component, a C-shaped hard rubber lock ring, is located between the crescent and the barrel. In normal use the ring blocks the crescent from being depressed. To fill the pen, the ring is turned until the gap in the ring is aligned with the crescent, allowing the crescent to be depressed, thus compressing the sac.

Many other variations on the basic sac and pressure bar mechanism were introduced in the first decades of the 20th century, such as the coin-filler (with a slot on the barrel, allowing the pressure bar to be depressed by use of a coin), the matchstick-filler (with a round hole, for a matchstick) and the blow-filler (with a hole at the end of the barrel, through which one blew to compress the sac).

=== Piston filling innovation ===
In 1908 Walter A. Sheaffer received a patent for an improved lever-filling pen. Introduced in 1912, Sheaffer's pens sold in rapidly increasing numbers and by 1920 Sheaffer had become one of the largest fountain pen makers in the United States.

Parker introduced the button filler, which had a button hidden beneath a blind cap on the end of the barrel; when pressed, it acted on a pressure bar inside to depress the ink sac.

One of the most complex filling mechanisms was introduced in 1952 with the Sheaffer Snorkel. The Snorkel had an axial tube below the nib that could be extended, allowing the pen to be filled from a bottle without needing to immerse the nib or to wipe it off after filling. With the advent of the modern plastic ink cartridge in the early 1950s most of these filling systems were phased out.

Screw-mechanism piston-fillers were made as early as the 1820s, but the mechanism's modern popularity begins with the original Pelikan of 1929, based upon a patent that was initially licensed to a Croatian company Moster-Penkala by inventor Theodore Kovacs. The basic idea is simple and intuitive: turn a knob at the end of the pen and a screw mechanism draws a piston up the barrel, sucking in ink. Pens with this mechanism remain very popular today. Some of the earlier models had to dedicate as much as half of the pen length to the mechanism. The advent of telescoping pistons has improved this; the Touchdown Filler was introduced by Sheaffer in 1949. It was advertised as an "Exclusive Pneumatic Down-stroke Filler."

To fill it, a knob at the end of the barrel is unscrewed and the attached plunger is drawn out to its full length. The nib is immersed in ink, the plunger is pushed in, compressing and then releasing the ink sac by means of air pressure. The nib is kept in the ink for approximately 10 seconds to allow the reservoir to fill. This mechanism is very closely modeled after a similar pneumatic filler introduced by Chilton over a decade earlier.

=== Modern filling mechanisms ===
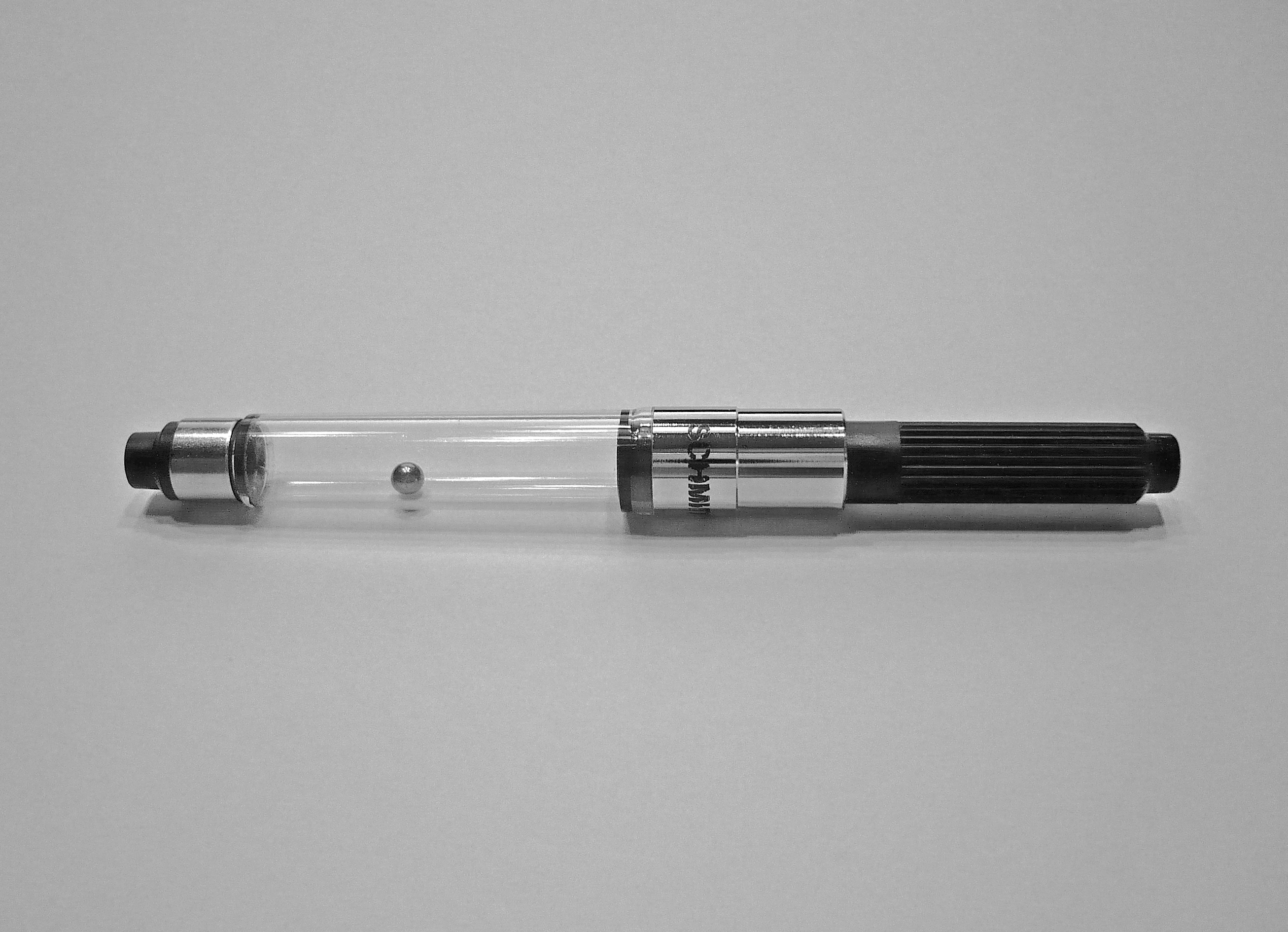
Schmidt K5 piston-style standard international size fountain pen converter, containing a user inserted 2.5 mm diameter Marine grade 316 stainless steel bearing ball

A capillary filling system was introduced by Parker in the Parker 61 in 1956. There were no moving parts: the ink reservoir within the barrel was open at the upper end, but contained a tightly rolled length of slotted, flexible plastic. To fill, the barrel was unscrewed, the exposed open end of the reservoir was placed in ink and the interstices of the plastic sheet and slots initiated capillary action, drawing up and retaining the ink. The outside of the reservoir was coated with Teflon, a repellent compound that released excess ink as it was withdrawn. Ink was transferred through a further capillary tube to the nib. No method of flushing the device was offered, and because of problems from clogging with dried and hardened ink, production was eventually stopped.

Around the year 2000, Pelikan introduced a filling system involving a valve in the blind end of the pen, which mates with a specially designed ink bottle. Thus docked, ink is then squeezed into the pen barrel (which, lacking any mechanism other than the valve itself, has nearly the capacity of an eyedropper-fill pen of the same size). This system had been implemented only in their "Level" line, which was discontinued in 2006.

Most pens today use either a piston filler, squeeze-bar filler or cartridge. Many pens are also compatible with a converter, which has the same fitting as the pen's cartridge and has a filling mechanism and a reservoir attached to it. This enables a pen to fill either from cartridges or from a bottle of ink. The most common type of converters are piston-style, but many other varieties may be found today. Piston-style converters generally have a transparent round tubular ink reservoir. Fountain pen inks feature differing surface tensions that can cause an ink to adhere or "stick" against the inside of the reservoir. Common solutions for this problem are adding a small (rust-proof) ink agitating object like a 316L or 904L stainless steel or zirconium dioxide bearing ball, spring or hollow tube in the tubular reservoir to mechanically promote free movement of the contained ink and ink/air exchange during writing. Adding a very small amount of surfactant such as Triton X-100 used in Kodak Photo-Flo 200 wetting agent to the ink will chemically promote free movement of the contained ink and ink/air exchange during writing. However, ink might react adversely to adding a surfactant.

Vacuum fillers, such as those used by Pilot in the Custom 823, utilize air pressure to fill the ink chamber. In this case, while the nib is submerged in ink, a plunger is pushed down the empty chamber to create a vacuum in the space behind it. The end of the chamber has a section wider than the rest, and when the plunger passes this point, the difference in air pressure in the area behind the plunger and the area ahead of it is suddenly evened out and ink rushes in behind the plunger to fill the chamber.

Converters are also available in several different types such as piston, plunger, squeeze and push button in rare cases.

== Cartridges ==
The first commercially successful ink cartridge system for fountain pens was patented in 1890 by the Eagle Pencil Company, using glass cartridges. In the 1920s the John Hancock pen featured cartridges made from thin copper tubing. From the 1930s on, Waterman sold pens in France that used glass cartridges. Cartridge-filling pens only became truly popular in the 1950s, however, with the advent of plastic cartridges. The first was the Italian LUS Atomica in 1952, but it was the Waterman C/F in 1953 that brought cartridge filling to the attention of the international market. Modern plastic cartridges can contain small ridges on the inside to promote free movement of the contained ink and ink/air exchange during writing. Often cartridges are closed with a small ball that gets pressed into the cartridge during insertion into the pen. This ball also aids free movement of the contained ink.

=== Standard international ===
Dimensions of short International Ink Cartridge

Most European fountain pen brands (for example Conway Stewart, Caran d'Ache, Faber-Castell, Michel Perchin, S.T. Dupont, Montegrappa, Stipula, Pelikan, Montblanc, Europen, Sigma, Delta, Italix, and Rotring) and some pen brands of other continents (for example Acura, Bexley, Esterbrook, Retro51, Tombow, and Platinum (with adaptor)) use so called "international cartridges" (AKA "European cartridges" or "standard cartridges" or "universal cartridges"), in short (38 mm in length, about 0.75 ml of capacity) or long (72 mm, 1.50 ml) sizes, or both. It is to some extent a standard, so the international cartridges of any manufacturer can be used in most fountain pens that accept international cartridges.

Also, converters that are meant to replace international cartridges can be used in most fountain pens that accept international cartridges. Some very compact fountain pens (for example Waterman Ici et La and Monteverde Diva) accept only short international cartridges. Converters can not be used in them (except for so-called mini-converters by Monteverde). Some pens (such as the modern Waterman models) have intentional fittings which prevent the usage of short cartridges. Such pens can only take a proprietary cartridge from the same manufacturer, in this case the long Waterman cartridges.

=== Proprietary offerings ===
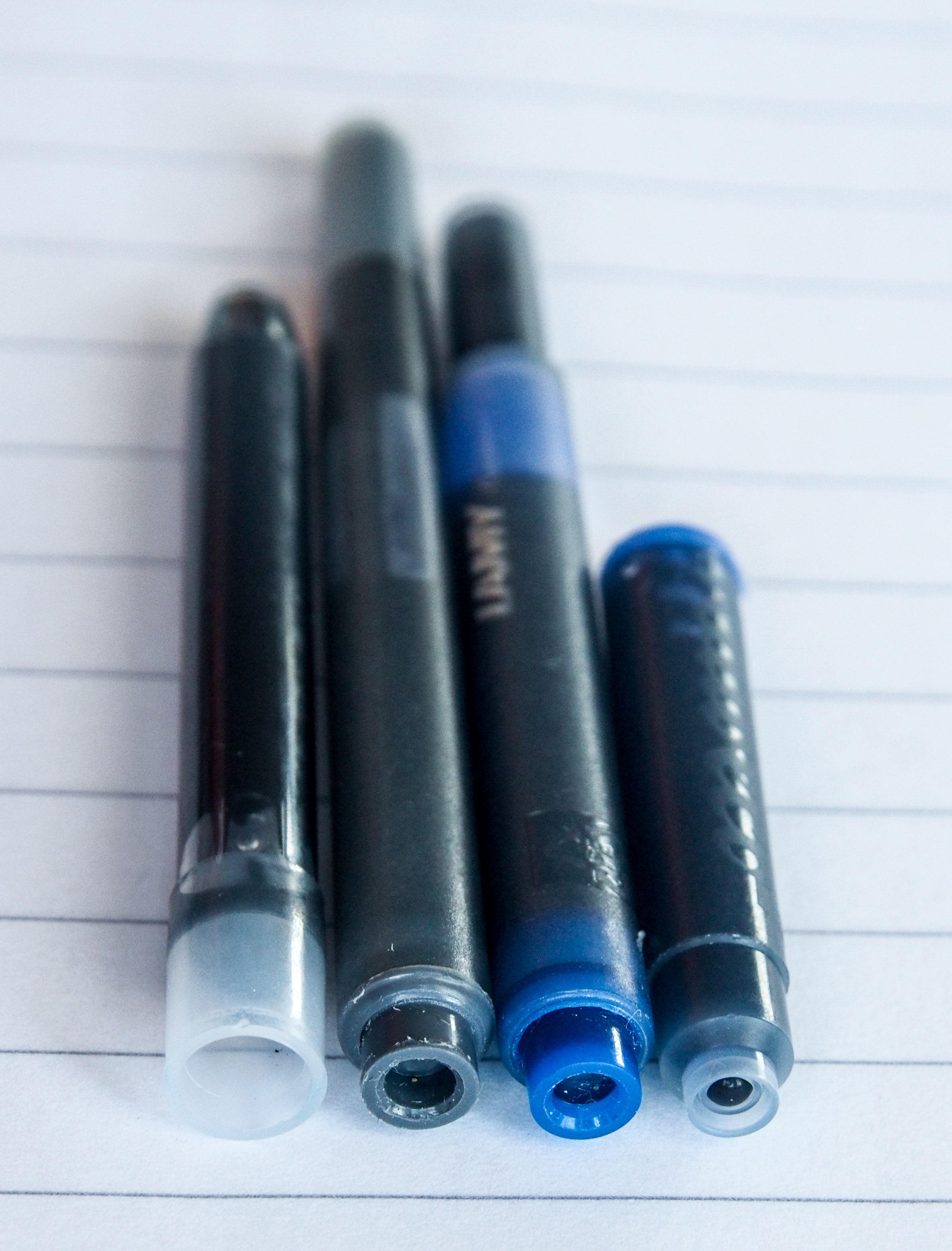
Proprietary cartridges (left to right): Pilot, Parker, Lamy, short standard international (made by Kaweco)

Many fountain pen manufacturers have developed their own proprietary cartridges, for example Parker, Lamy, Sheaffer, Pelikan, Cross, Sailor, Platinum, Platignum, Waterman, and Namiki. Fountain pens from Aurora, Hero, Duke, and Uranus accept the same cartridges and converters that Parker uses and vice versa (Lamy cartridges, though not officially, are known to interchange with Parker cartridges also). Cartridges of Aurora are slightly different from cartridges by Parker.

Corresponding converters to be used instead of such proprietary cartridges are usually made by the same company that made the fountain pen itself. Some very compact fountain pens accept only proprietary cartridges made by the same company that made that pen, such as Sheaffer Agio Compact and Sheaffer Prelude Compact. It is not possible to use a converter in them at all. In such pens the only practical way to use another brand of ink is to fill empty cartridges with bottled ink using a syringe.

Standard international cartridges are closed by a small ball, wedged tightly inside the ink exit hole. When the cartridge is pressed into the pen, a small pin pushes in the ball, which falls inside the cartridge. The Parker and Lamy cartridges do not have such a ball, instead being closed by a barrier of plastic, which is pierced by a pin when inserted in the pen.

=== Concerns and alternatives ===
Pen manufacturers that produce proprietary cartridges (which in almost all cases are the more expensive ones like the ones mentioned above) tend to discourage the use of cheaper internationally standardised short/long cartridges or adaptations thereof due to their variance in ink quality in the cartridges which may not offer as much performance, or be of lesser quality than the pen's ink cartridge that has been designed specifically for the pen itself. Due to potential additive deficits such as glycerides or uneven pigmentation, cheaper ink may also skip or produce uneven colour on the page and "feather" (spread out of the originally written line) more on thinner grades of paper (e.g. 75 gsm).

While cartridges are more convenient to refill than bottle filling, converter and bottle filling systems are still sold. Non-cartridge filling systems tend to be slightly more economical in the long run since ink is generally less expensive in bottles than in cartridges. Advocates of bottle-based filling systems also cite less waste of plastic for the environment, a wider selection of inks, easier cleaning of pens (as drawing the ink in through the nib helps dissolve old ink), and the ability to check and refill inks at any time.

== Inks ==
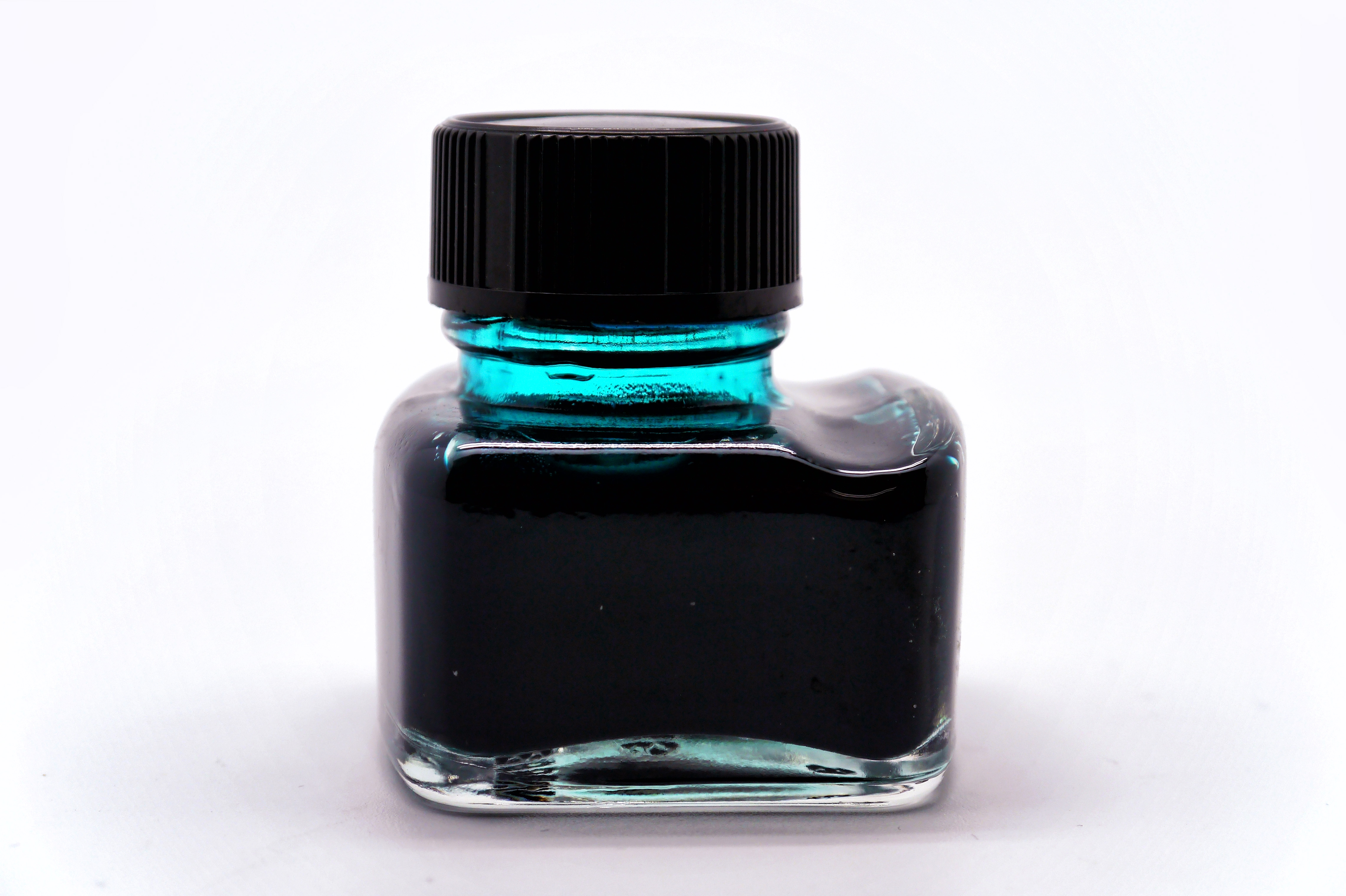
A bottle of turquoise ink

Inks intended for use with fountain pens are water-based. These inks are commonly available in bottles. Plastic cartridges came into use in the 1950s, but bottled inks are still the mainstay for many fountain pen enthusiasts. Bottled inks usually cost less than an equivalent amount in cartridges and afford a wider variety of colours and properties.

Fountain pens are not as tightly coupled with their inks as ballpoints or gel pens are, yet some care must be taken when selecting their inks. Contemporary fountain pen inks are almost exclusively dye-based because pigment particles usually clog the narrow passages.

Traditional iron gall inks intended for dip pens are not suitable for fountain pens as they will corrode the pen (a phenomenon known as flash corrosion caused by the high acidity) and destroy the functionality of the fountain pen. Instead, modern surrogate iron gall formulas are offered for fountain pens. These modern iron gall inks contain a small amount of ferro gallic compounds that are gentler for the inside of a fountain pen, but can still be corrosive if left in the pen for a long period. To avoid corrosion on delicate metal parts and ink clogging, a more thorough than usual cleaning regime – which requires the ink to be flushed out regularly with water – is sometimes advised by manufacturers or resellers.

Some pigmented inks do exist for fountain pens, such as "Carbon Black" and "Chou Kuro" made by the brand Platinum as well as Rohrer & Klingner and De Atramentis inks from Germany, but these are uncommon. Normal India ink cannot be used in fountain pens because it contains shellac as a binder which would very quickly clog such pens.

Inks ideally should be fairly free-flowing, free of sediment, and non-corrosive, though this generally excludes permanence and prevents large-scale commercial use of some colored dyes. Proper care and selection of ink will prevent most problems.

== Today ==
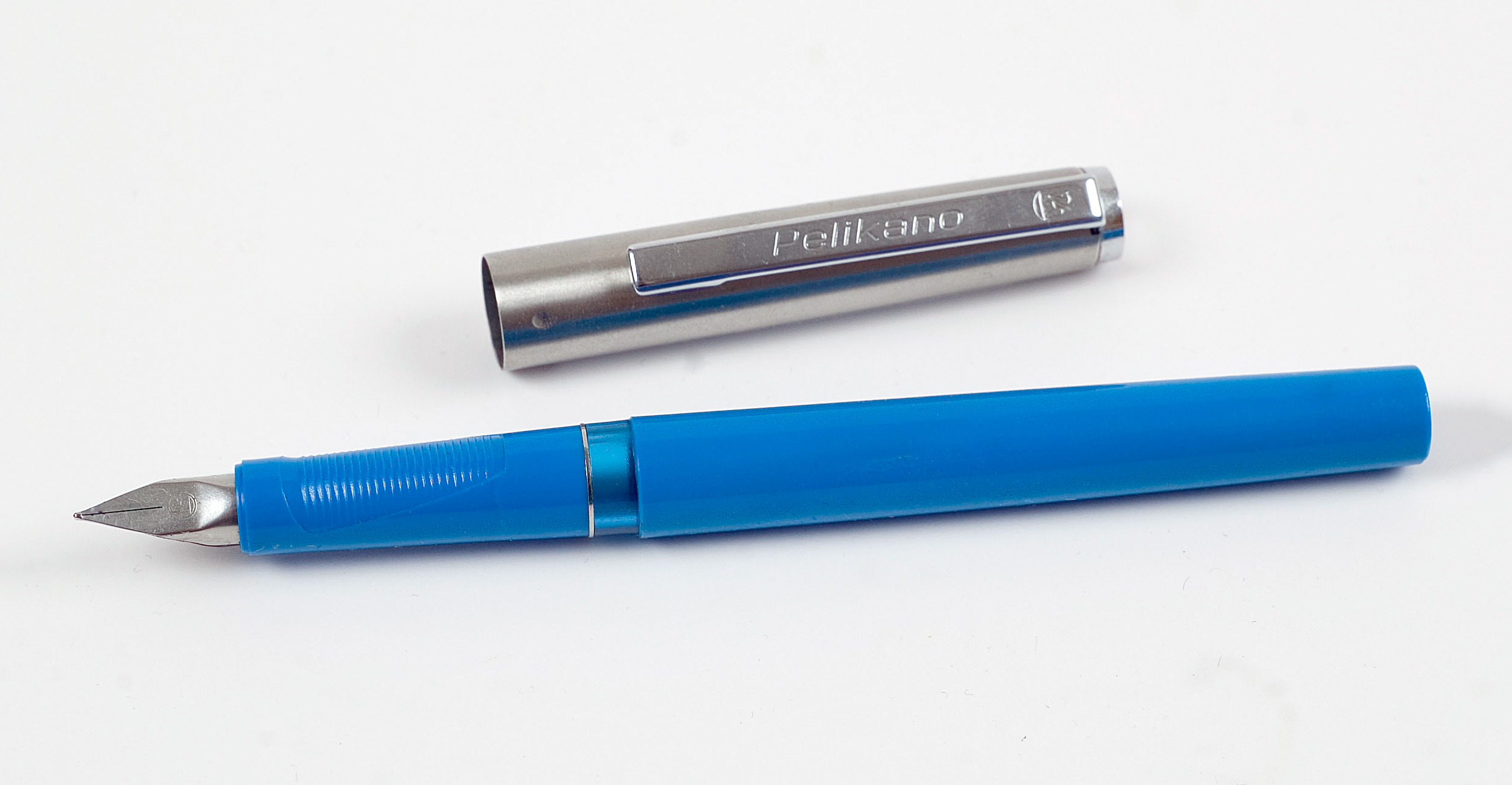
A 1970s model metal and plastic fountain pen

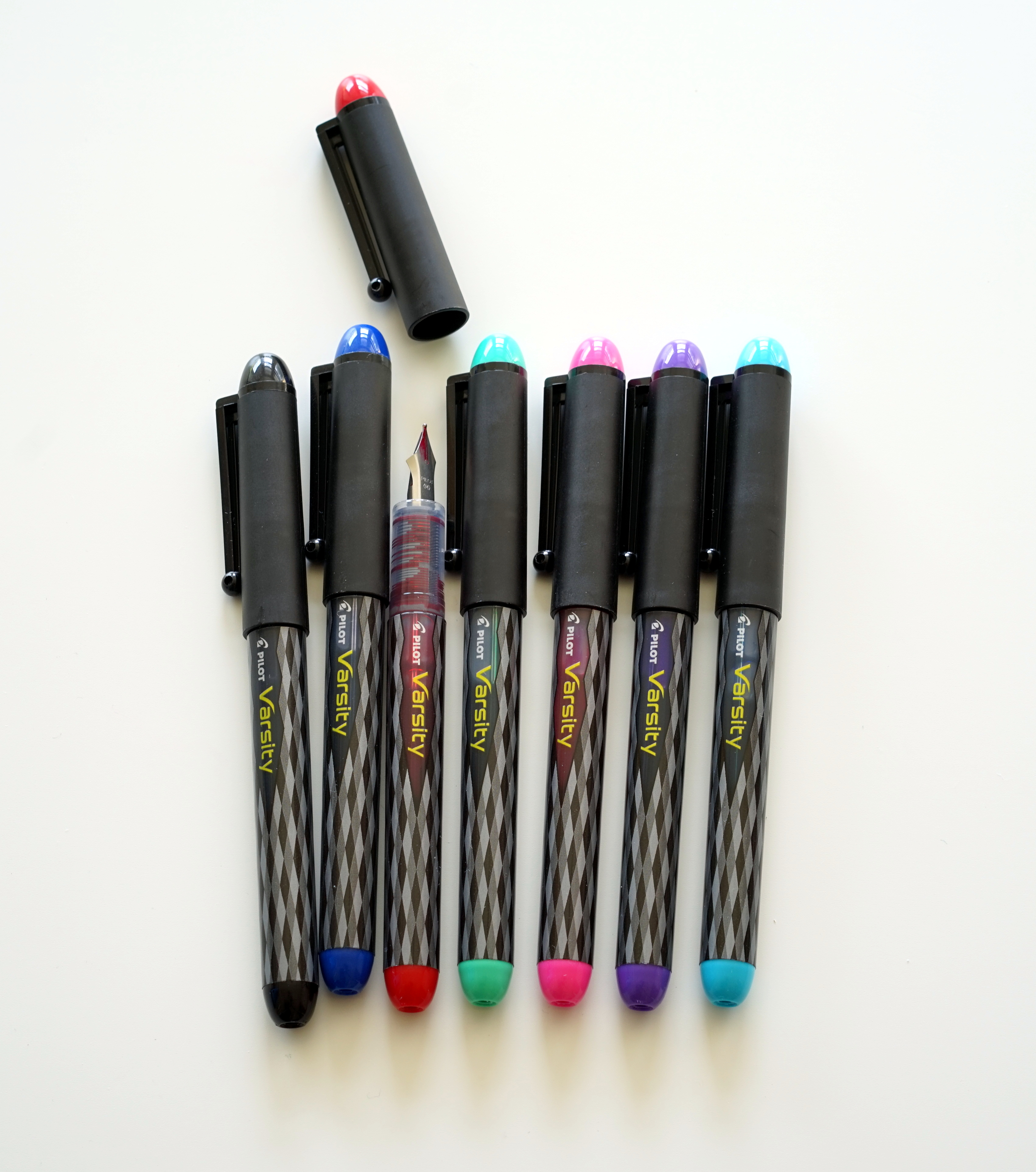
The Pilot Varsity, an inexpensive disposable fountain pen

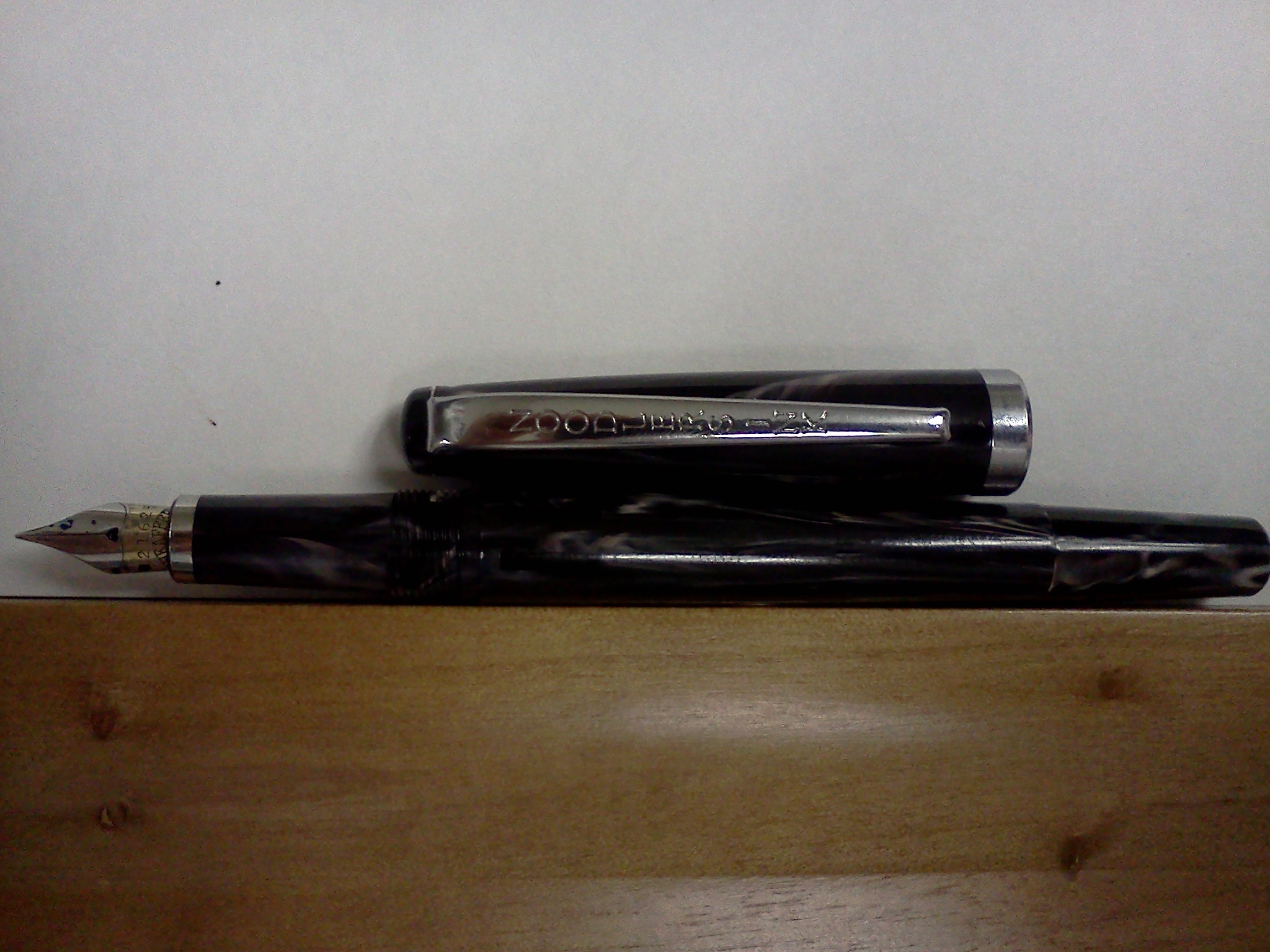
A modern celluloid fountain pen fitted with a vintage nib

While no longer the primary writing instrument in modern times, fountain pens are used for important official works such as signing valuable documents. Today, fountain pens are often treated as luxury goods and sometimes as status symbols. Fountain pens may serve as an everyday writing instrument, much like the common ballpoint pen. Good quality steel and gold pens are available inexpensively today, particularly in Europe and China, and there are "disposable" fountain pens such as the Pilot Varsity. In France and Germany, in particular, the use of fountain pens is widespread, since in many European countries children still begin to learn writing with this kind of writing device. To avoid mistakes, special ink can be used that can be made invisible by applying an ink eraser.

Fountain pens can serve various artistic purposes such as expressive penmanship and calligraphy, pen and ink artwork, and professional art and design. Many users also favor the perceived elegance, personalization, and sentimentality associated with fountain pens, which computers and ballpoint pens seem to lack, and often state that once they start using fountain pens, ballpoints become awkward to use due to the extra motor effort needed and lack of expressiveness. For ergonomics, fountain pens may relieve physiological stress from writing; alternatives such as the ballpoint pen can induce more pain and damage to those with arthritis. Some also believe they could improve academic performance.

In some countries, fountain pens are usual in lower school grades, believed to teach children better control over writing as many common mistakes of people not used to handwriting (like too much pressure or incorrect hold) feel unnatural or are almost impossible when using traditional pen tips.

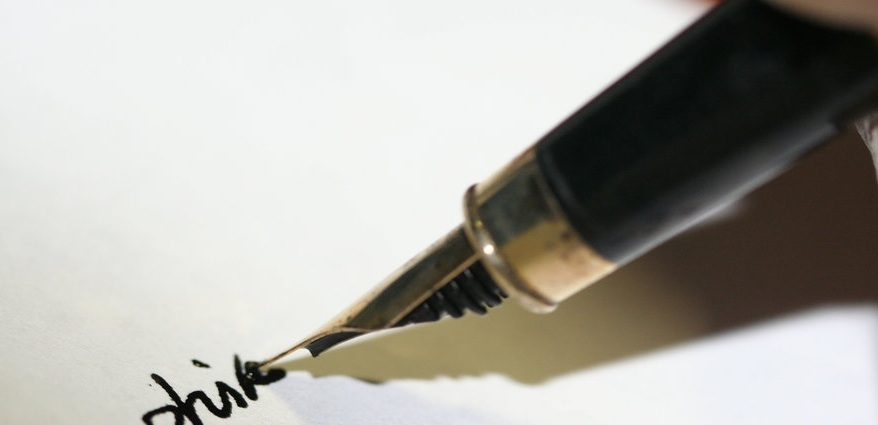
A modern fountain pen, writing in cursive script

Fountain pens are a popular collectable. Fancier pens have been made of precious metals and sometimes even inlaid with jewels. Some are decorated with lacquer, including Japanese maki-e. Avid communities of pen enthusiasts collect and use antique and modern pens and also collect and exchange information about old and modern inks, ink bottles, and inkwells. Collectors may decide to use the antiques in addition to showcasing them in closed spaces such as glass displays.

News outlets report that rather than declining, fountain pen sales have been steadily rising over the last decade. There is a clear resurgence in the appeal and culture of the fountain pen, whether for purposes of collection, enjoyment or as a "lifestyle item". Many agree that the "personal touch" of a fountain pen has led to such a resurgence with modern consumers looking for an alternative in a world of digital products and services.

Amazon reported "sales so far this year [2012] have doubled compared with the same period in 2011. They are four times higher than 2010." The popularity of fountain pens continues to show growth. The market-research firm Euromonitor reported that fountain pen retail sales were up 2.1% in 2016 from a year earlier, reaching $1.046 billion.

== See also ==
- Demonstrator pen
- Fountain pen inks
- Inkwell
- IAMPETH
- List of pen types, brands and companies
- List of terms about pen and ink

== Bibliography ==
- Finlay, Michael (1990). Western Writing Implements in the Age of the Quill Pen. Wheteral: Plains Books. ISBN 1-872477-00-3.
- Fischler, George; Schneider, Stuart (1992). Fountain Pens and Pencils. New York: Shiffer Publishing. ISBN 0-88740-346-8.
- Lambrou, Andreas (2003). Fountain Pens of the World. New York: Philip Wilson Publisher. ISBN 0-302-00668-0.
- Park, JongJin (2013). Fountain Pens. Seoul: LBIG Media Publishing. ISBN 978-89-94819-09-9.
