= Fountain pen ink =

Writing material for fountain pens

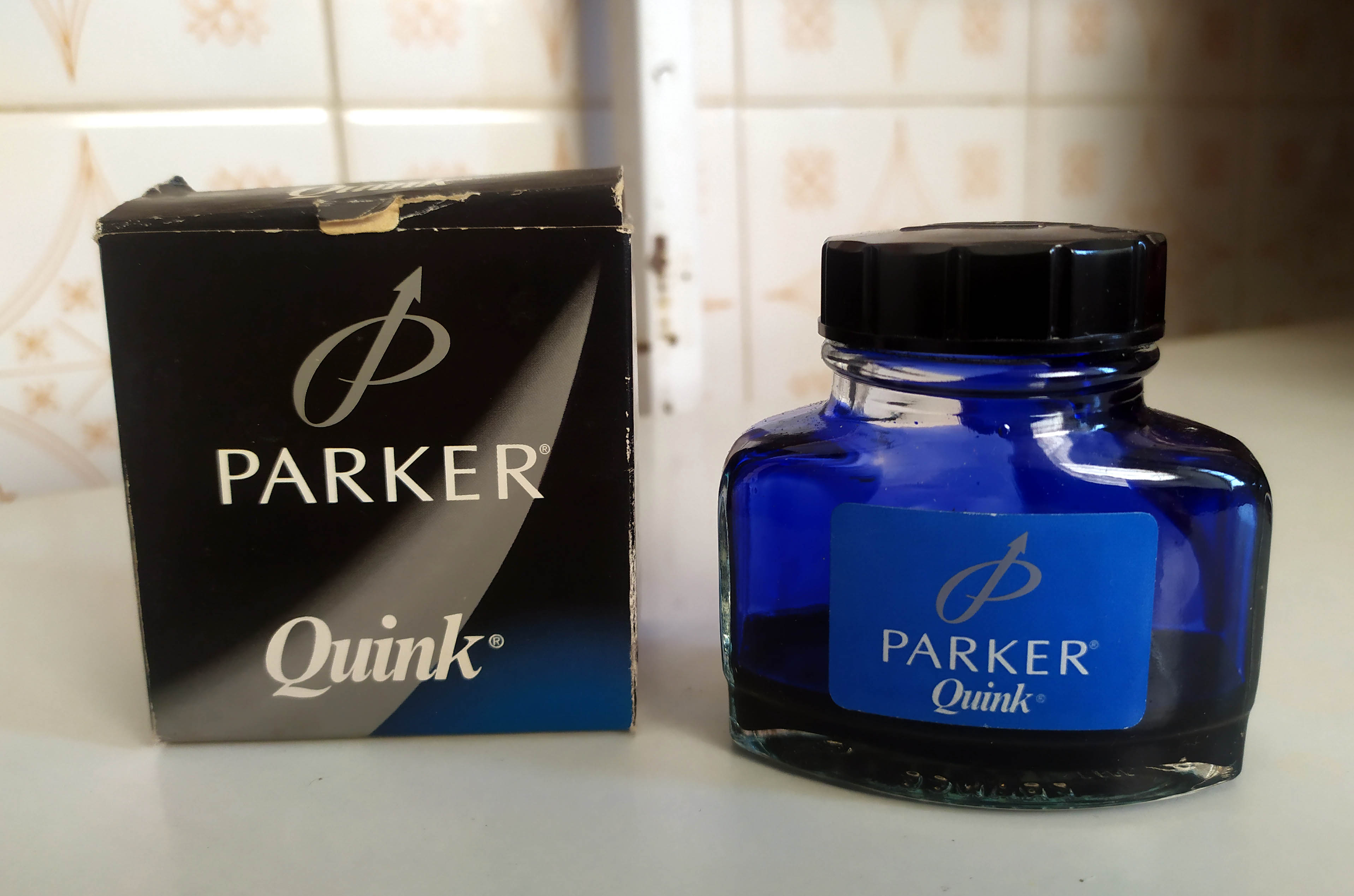
- Parker Quink box and bottle
- Type: Ink
- Inventor: Jacques Herbin
- Inception: 1670; 356 years ago
- Manufacturer: List: Hero; Kaweco; Koh-i-Noor; Lamy; Montegrappa; Montblanc; Parker; Pelikan; Pilot; Sheaffer; Waterman
- Available: Yes

Fountain pen ink is a water-based ink intended for use with fountain pens.

== History ==
A form of ink that predates fountain pens by millennia is iron gall ink, which was described in a text by Martianus Capella from the 5th century CE. This blue-black ink is made from iron salts and tannic acid from vegetable sources. Prior to the ready availability of manufactured ink, iron gall ink was often homemade. Stark's ink was a 19th century iron gall ink recipe, named after the Scottish chemist who devised it after spending several decades experimenting with hundreds of formulations. Another formulation was Alizarine ink, devised by a German chemist in 1855.

Iron gall ink was used in fountain pens when they were invented but has the disadvantage of causing corrosion to metal parts. Modern formulations of iron gall ink are somewhat less corrosive and are still occasionally used in applications that require permanence.

The French company Herbin, established 1670 by Jacques Herbin, is credited as being the first fountain ink manufacturer in the world. Jaques Herbin established his business in Paris to produce sealing wax after multiples journeys to India, as he was employed by the Compagnie des Indes Orientales. During those journeys he collected the ideas and ingredients to start his business. Herbin then expanded into quality writing ink.

Herbin manufactured inks from East India Company trading posts in Pondicherry, India, and Mahé, Seychelles. The J. Herbin company made ink for the King of France, Louis XIV, and a black ink exclusively of Victor Hugo, author of The Hunchback of Notre Dame and Les Miserables.

== Composition ==
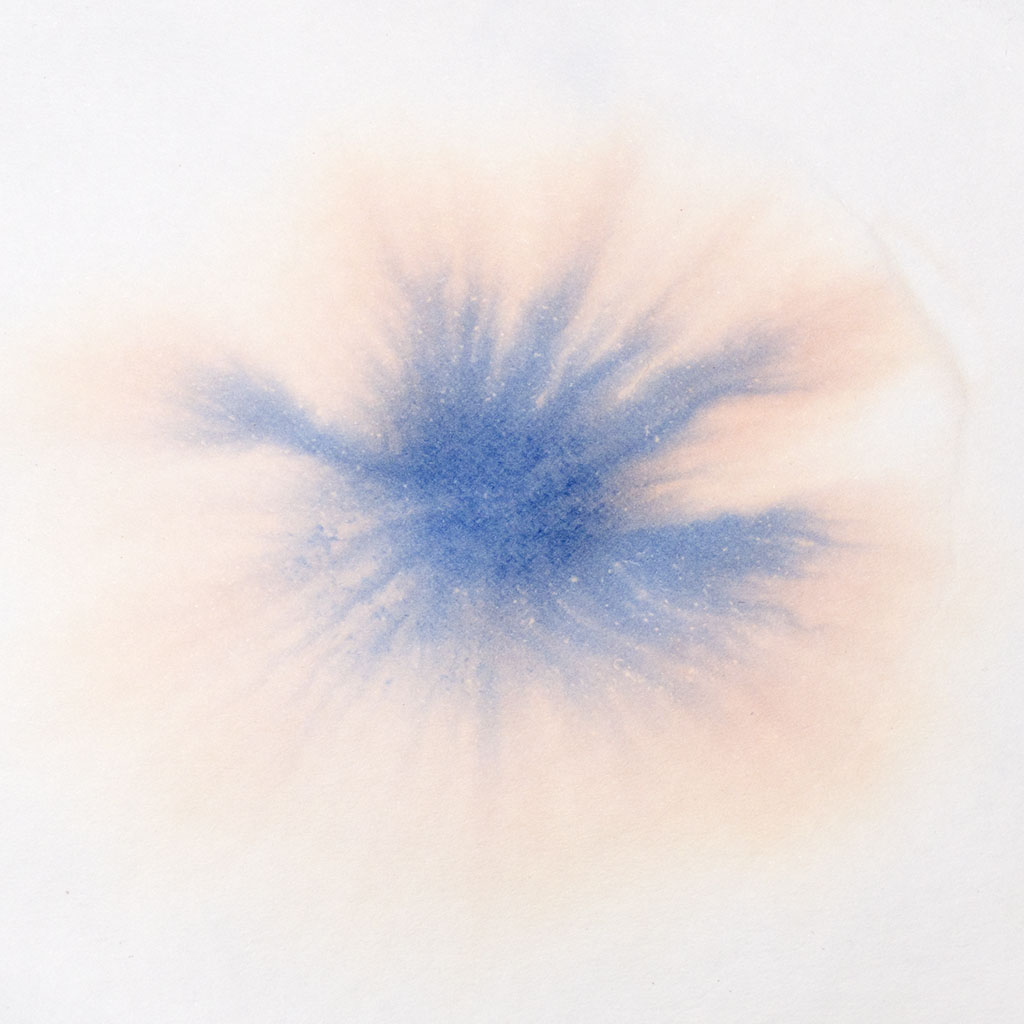
Blot of Quink ink on damp paper – the blue dye has separated from the other components, which are peach-coloured.

Fountain pen ink is almost exclusively dye-based because fountain pens operate on the principle of capillary action. Pigment-based inks (which contain solid pigment particles in a liquid suspension) tend to clog the narrow passages of the pen. India ink, a carbon pigment-based ink, also contains a binder, gum arabic, which can quickly clog such pens. Some pigmented inks do exist for fountain pens, but these nanoparticle inks use pigments that are very finely ground to reduce the chance of clogging. They have the advantage of being waterproof and are used by artists who want to draw lines that will not be affected by a watercolour wash.

The ideal fountain pen ink is free-flowing, free of sediment, non-corrosive and quick-drying. These qualities may be compromised in the interests of permanence, manufacturability and in order to use some widely available dyes.

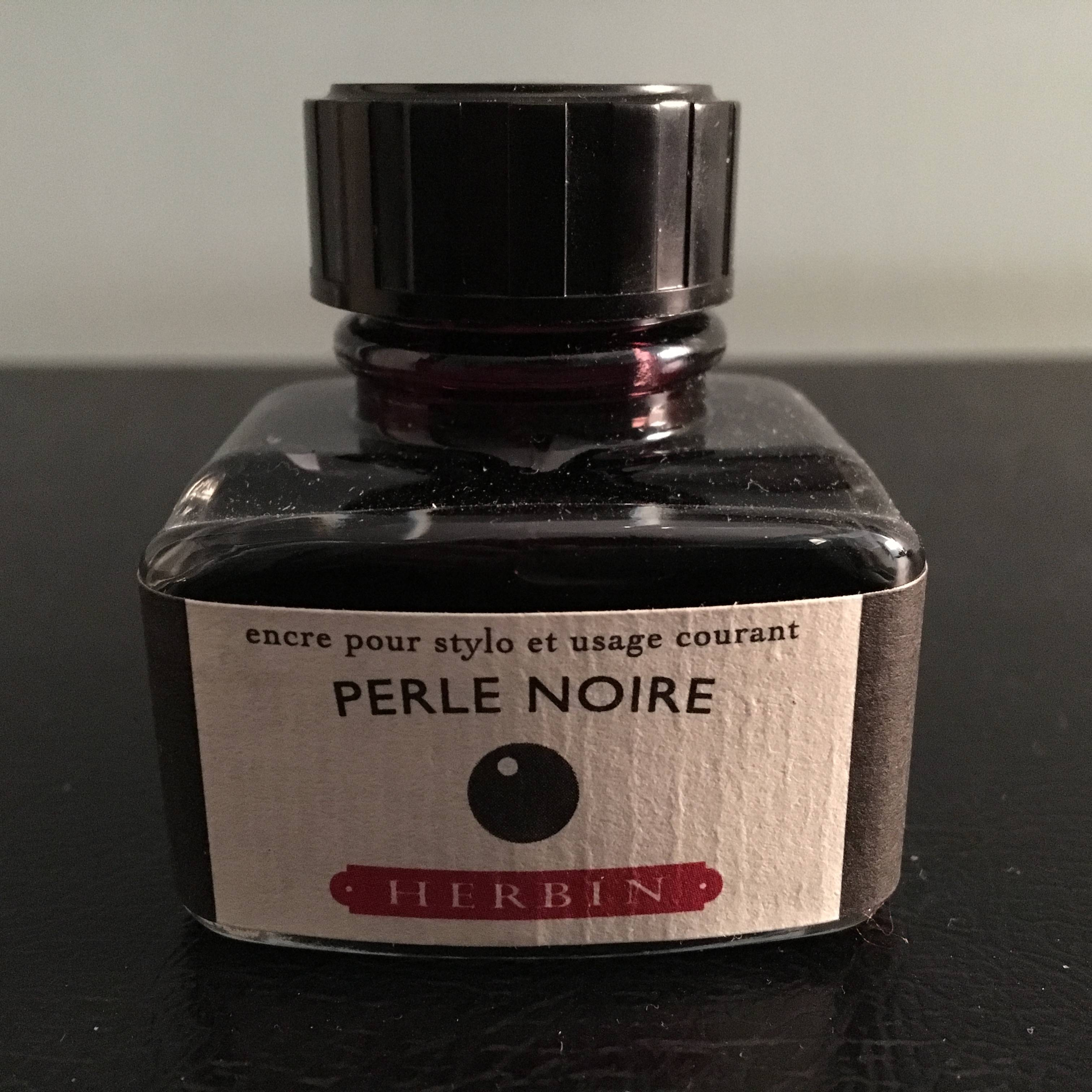
"Perle Noir" ink by J. Herbin. Having started his business in 1670, Herbin is regarded as the first fountain ink manufacturer ever.

Red inks usually contain the dye eosin. Blue inks often contain triarylmethane dye. Black inks are mixtures. In addition to water, the non-dye components (collectively referred to as the vehicle) might include polymeric resins, humectants to retard premature drying, pH modifiers, anti-foaming agents, biocides to prevent fungal and bacterial growth, and wetting agents (surfactants). Surfactants reduce the surface tension of the ink; distilled water has a surface tension of 72 dyn/cm (72 × 10^{−3} N/m), but the desirable value for ink is between 38 and 45 dyn/cm (38 to 45 × 10^{−3} N/m). If the ink's surface tension were too high, then it would not flow through the pen; if it were too low, then the ink would run out of the pen with less control.

Some users mix inks to create their own colours. Some combinations of inks may cause unexpected colour changes, even if the inks are from the same manufacturer. This is a result of chemical reactions between the different components. The colour of many dyes depends on pH, and some lose their colour entirely outside a certain pH range. Mixing inks may also alter the solubility of some dye components; for example, an alcohol-based ink may contain components that are insoluble in water, and these will precipitate or coagulate if the alcohol-based ink is mixed with a water-based ink.

== Delivery ==
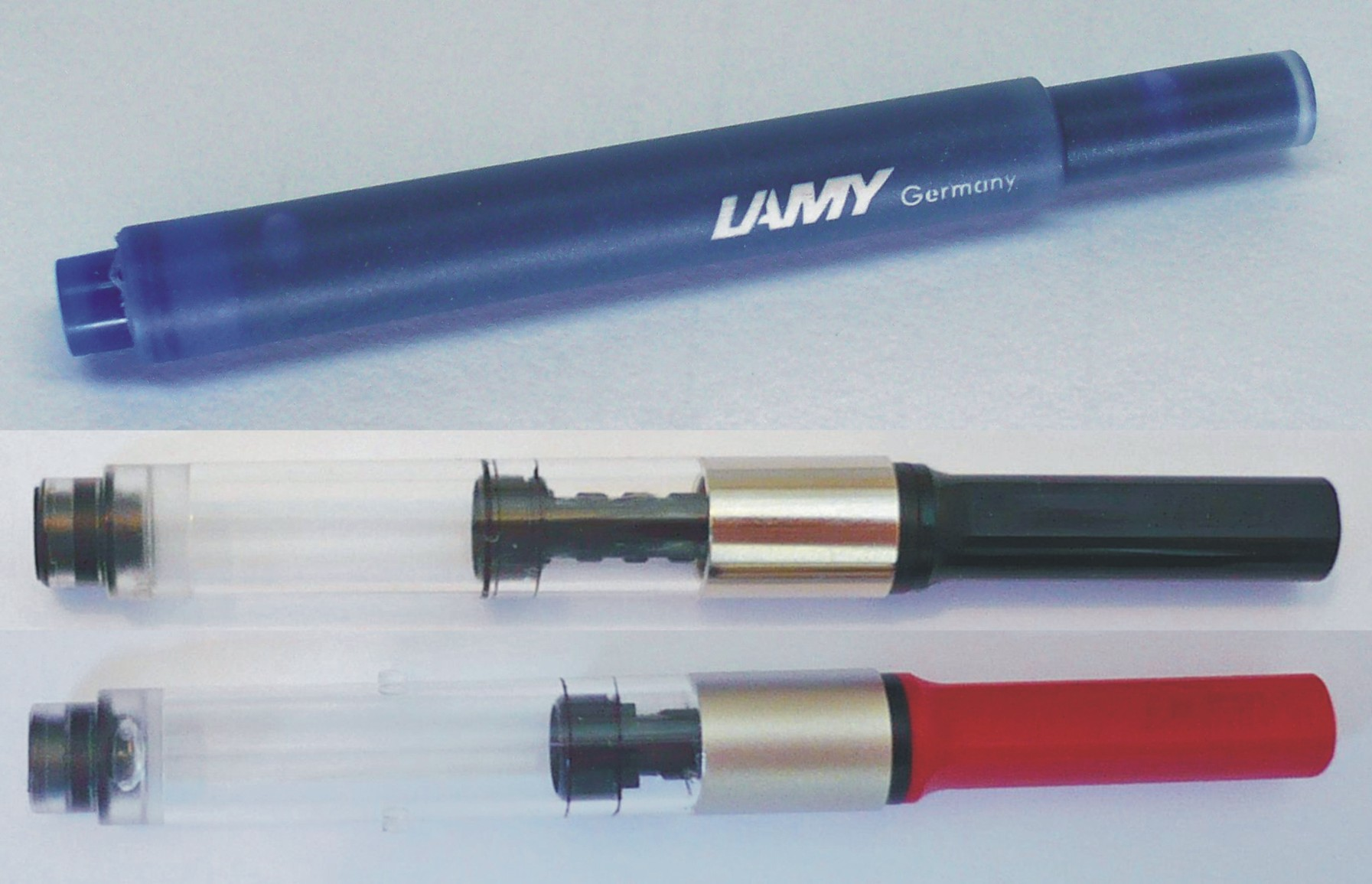
Top to bottom: blue Lamy T 10 proprietary ink cartridge and Z 27 and Z 28 ink converters

Fountain pens carry ink within the barrel, traditionally either inserted at one end in bulk with a syringe or eyedropper pipette, or through a mechanical filling system built into the pen (such as a piston or vacuum-pump mechanism). For such fountain pens, ink is available in bottles which will typically refill an individual pen many tens of times. Simpler fountain pens use pre-filled ink cartridges, although in many cases the cartridge can be replaced with a converter which replicates the mechanical filling action of more expensive pens. The cost per millilitre of ink tends to be lower for bottled ink than for cartridges, while cartridges can be simpler to use.

Care must be taken when using some vintage pens manufactured from celluloid, as this material can become stained by long-term exposure to some inks.

== Manufacturers ==
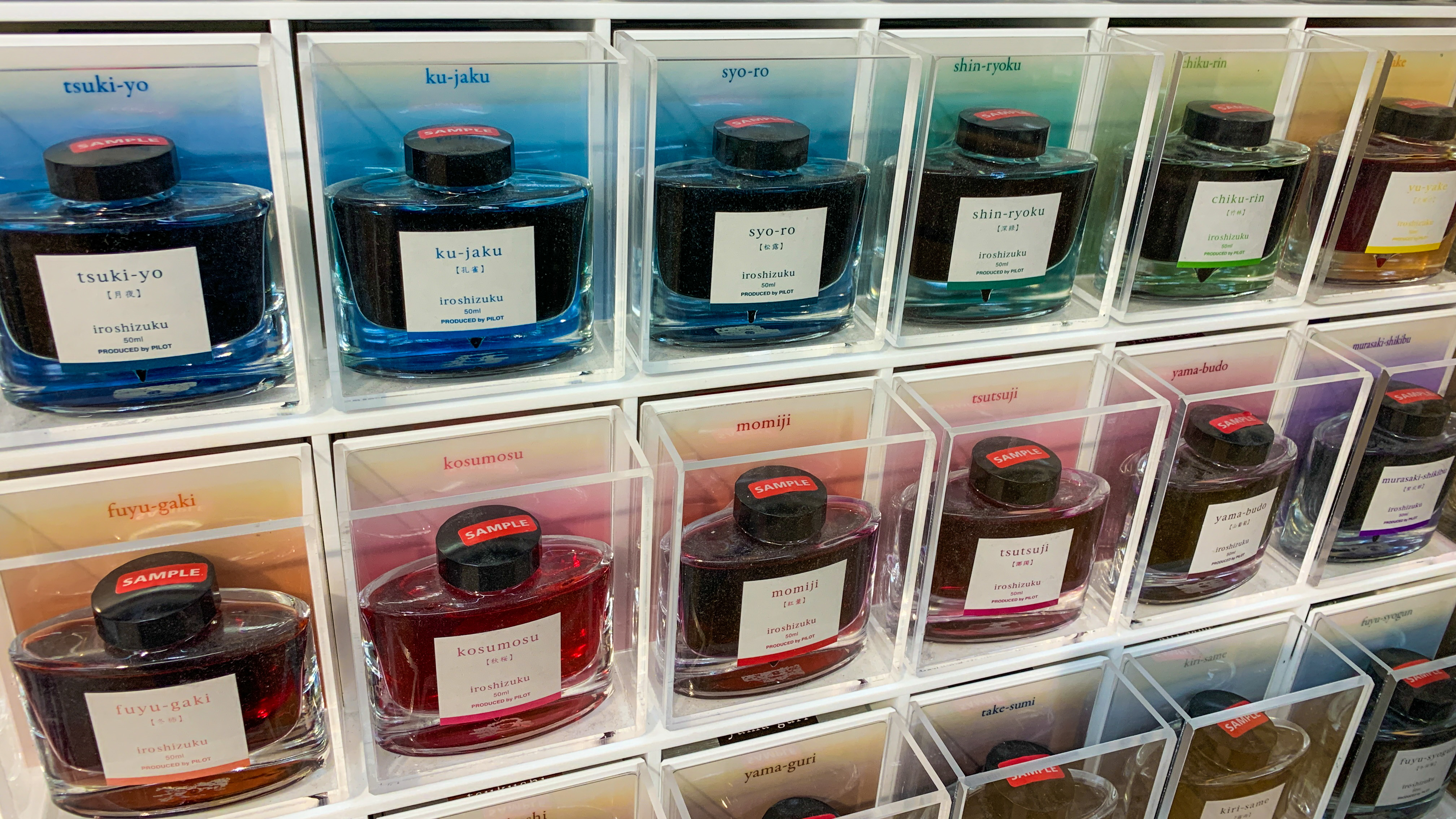
A range of different coloured Pilot Iroshizuku inks for sale in Tokyo, 2019

Most fountain pen manufacturers also provide a brand of ink. For example, Parker sells "Quink", Pilot sells "Iroshizuku", Wancher sells "Silk Road", and Sheaffer sells "Skrip", while manufacturers like Waterman, Lamy, Hero, Pelikan, Birmingham Pen Company, Thornton's Luxury Goods, Kaweco, Koh-i-Noor, Montegrappa and Montblanc sell ink under the same branding as their fountain pens.

The recent resurgence in fountain pen use has also created a market for companies that specialize in ink, such as the British company Diamine, the German company De Atramentis, and American companies such as Private Reserve Ink and Noodler's Ink. These companies manufacture ink in dozens of different colours. Some companies that specialize in ink, like Noodler's and Private Reserve Ink, have also created ink with special properties, like glow in the dark, waterproofing, highlighting and indestructible (document) inks.

== Durability and security ==
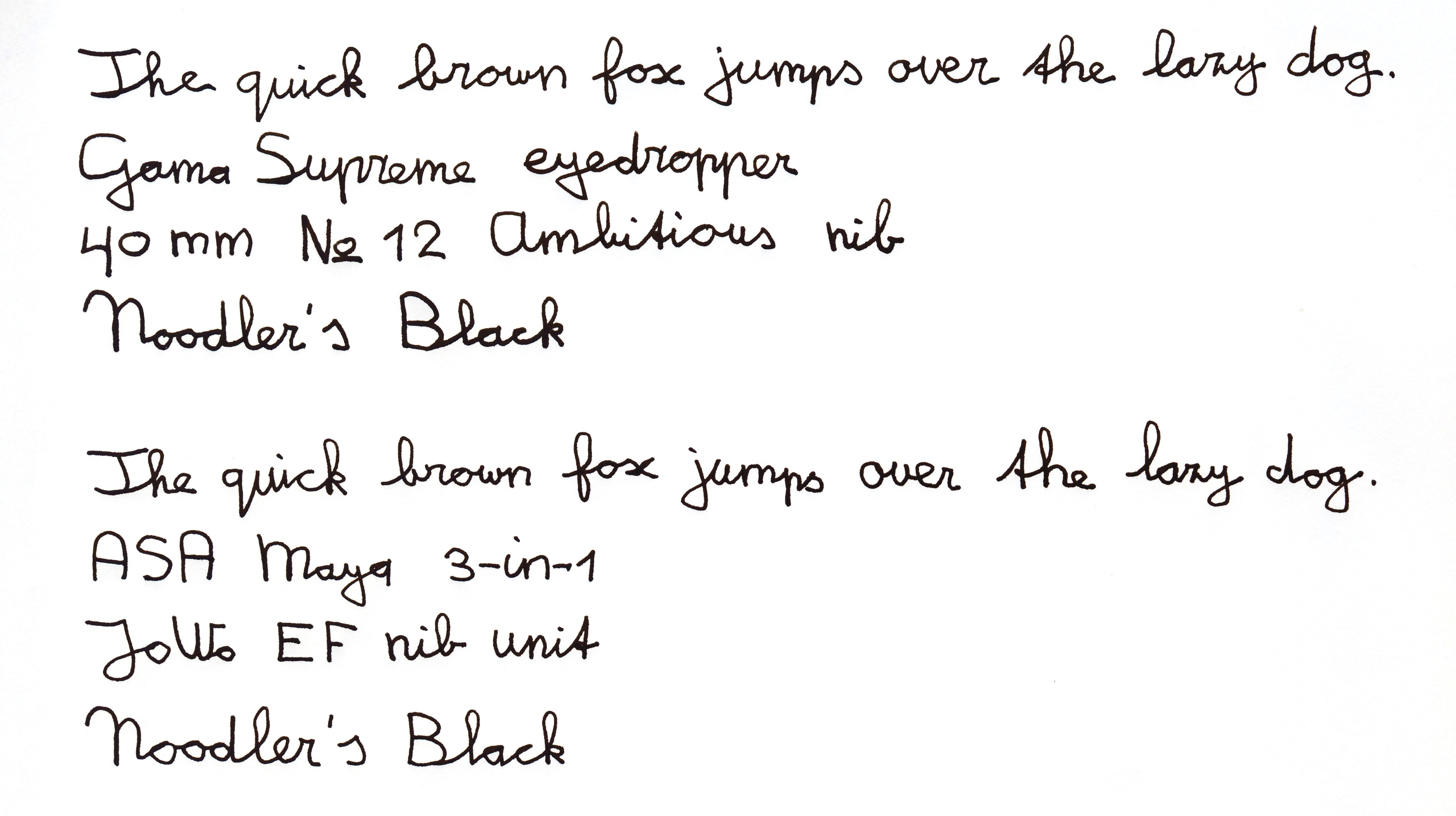
Noodler's Black fountain pen ink writing samples. This is a 'bulletproof' permanent ink featuring cellulose-reactive dye.

In the late 20th century, particular attention has been paid by ink manufacturers to the durability of their products against the effects of time, light, moisture, and efforts at forgery or falsification (see Check washing). Some of these inks use pigments – the solid pigment particles lodge between the cellulose fibers that make up the paper and are unaffected by attempts to remove them with solvents. Other inks use dyes that chemically bond with the paper's cellulose, and which likewise resist removal by solvents. A disadvantage of the dye inks is that, if spilled, they will form irremovable stains on clothing made from cotton, which also contains cellulose. Also, some "secure" inks are vulnerable to removal using powerful infra-red lasers.
