= Pact ink =

Ink used In occultism

In occultism, pact ink is the specially prepared ink that a contract with the devil must be written in, otherwise the contract is invalid. Various recipes exist. Detailed instructions are rare. The basic recipe is the same as that for Iron gall ink.

== Recipes ==
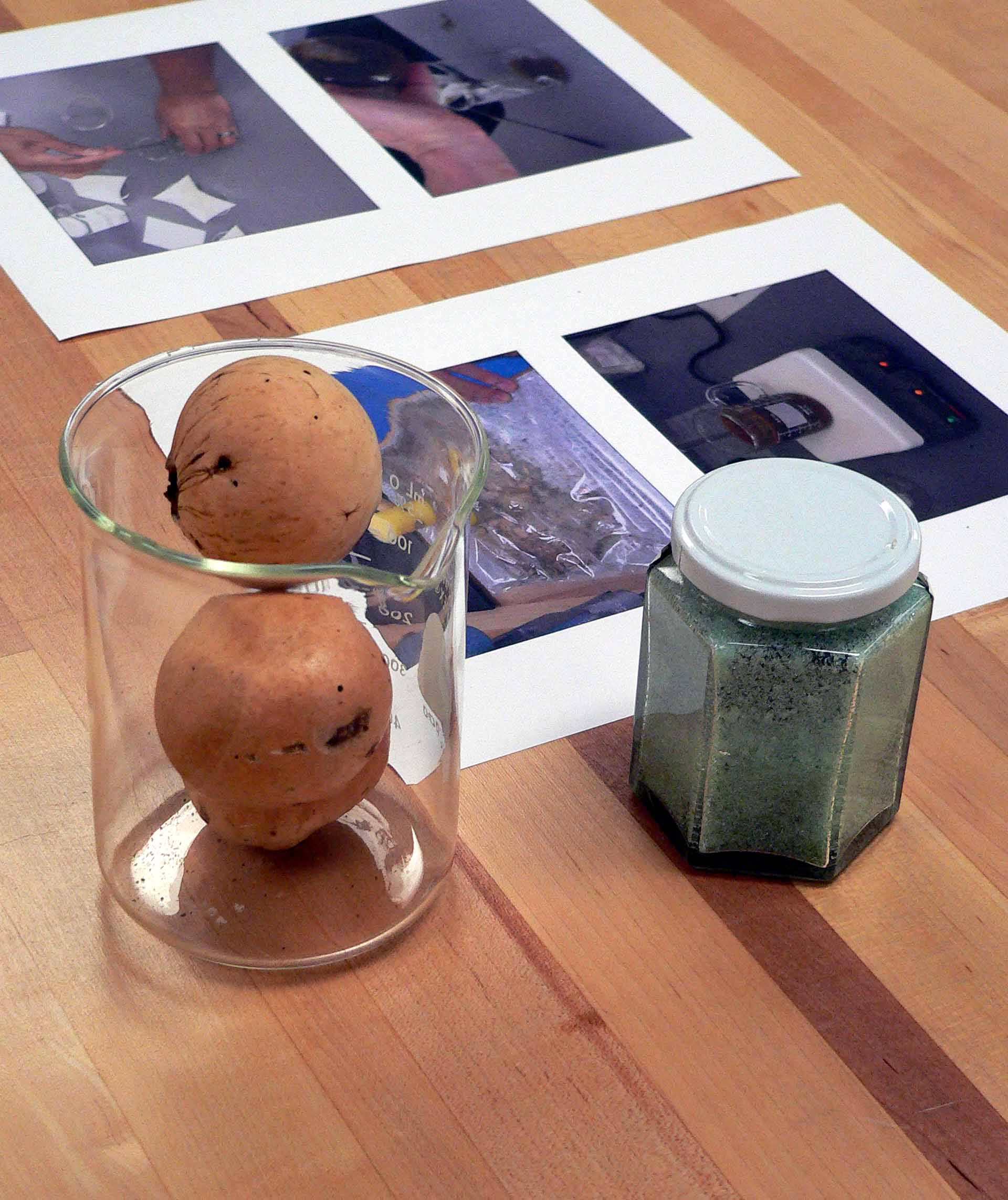
Oak galls and ferrous sulfate

A 14th century recipe for "Pact Ink for Devils and Spirits" is:

- Gall nuts - 10 ounces (280 g)
- Roman Vitriol or Green Copperas (ferrous sulfate) - 3 ounces (85 g)
- Rock alum - 3 ounces (85 g)
- Gum arabic - 3 ounces (85 g)

Arthur Edward Waite's Book of Black Magic gives a similar recipe, but saying to include either rock alum or gum arabic, and including directions.
