= Namiki =

Japanese fountain pen brand

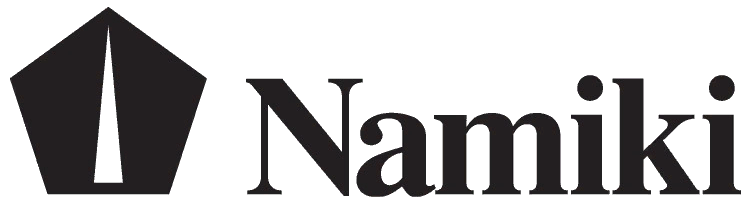
- Product type: Fountain pens, inks
- Current owner: Pilot Corporation
- Country: Japan
- Introduced: 1925; 101 years ago by Ryosuke Namiki
- Website: pilot-namiki.com

Namiki is a Japanese brand of writing implements, most specifically, fountain pens, owned by the Pilot Corporation. Namiki is mostly famous for its handmade maki-e (a Japanese lacquerware craft with a wide range of fine and decorative arts) designs on urushi-based lacquers.

"Namiki" is the surname of Ryosuke Namiki, the founder of the Pilot Corporation, named "Namiki Manufacturing Company" until 1938 when it became "Pilot Pen Co., Ltd.". The brand name Namiki came to fame in the early 20th century when Dunhill retailed in the west the Maki-e pens produced by Pilot under the brand "Dunhill-Namiki". This partnership has continued to the present day (occasionally Namiki makes a Limited Edition for Dunhill) although Namiki has always been owned by Pilot.

== History ==
Most of the fountain pens had been made of ebonite, a material that combines sulfur and rubber. However, ebonite changed color and lost its shine as the years went by. Being aware of this, the Namiki Co. Ltd. (current "Pilot Corporation") started to try different methods and materials to overcome the problem. After some attempts, they discovered that lacquer coating could tolerate deterioration and make pens more durable. They also tried painting designs on fountain bodies, using the maki-e technique, The process would be later patented by Pilot.

In 1925 the Namiki brand was launched to market, with lacquer artists Shisui Rokkaku and Gonroku Matsuda invited to make fountain pens. Ryosuke Namiki and Masao Wada (founders of Pilot Co. in 1918) traveled to promote their maki-e pens in Western countries. In 1926, a Pilot Office was opened in London, England, and four years later a contract was signed with the Alfred Dunhill Ltd. to commercialize Namiki pens in the main European cities and the United States under the brand "Dunhill-Namiki Made in Japan". The brand would later expand to New York, Shanghai and Singapore.

== Models ==
Namiki fountain pens and non-disposable Pilot fountain pens share the Pilot/Namiki proprietary ink refill cartridge, with inks available in several colors. Converters of both the piston type and squeeze type are also available to allow Namiki and Pilot fountain pens to be filled from ink bottles.

The curve-sided Namiki ink bottle has an inner inkwell to keep the nib steady during filling and also to allow almost the last few drops of ink to be taken from the bottle into a pen.

As of November 2019, collections commercialized by Namiki include the "Emperor", the most renowned collection of the Namiki brand. All models have a base layer of Urushi with Maki-e art drawn on to the base layer. There are seven models in this collection, Gold Fish (金魚), Dragon (龍), Owl (梟), Kylin (麒麟), Carp on Waterfall (鯉の滝登り), and Treasure (宝).

Other collections are Yukari, Yukari Royale, Chinkin, Nippon Art, Urushi and Limited Edition.

== See also ==
- Pilot Corp. – owner and manufacturer
- maki-e
- Japanese lacquerware
