= Atramentum =

Black substance

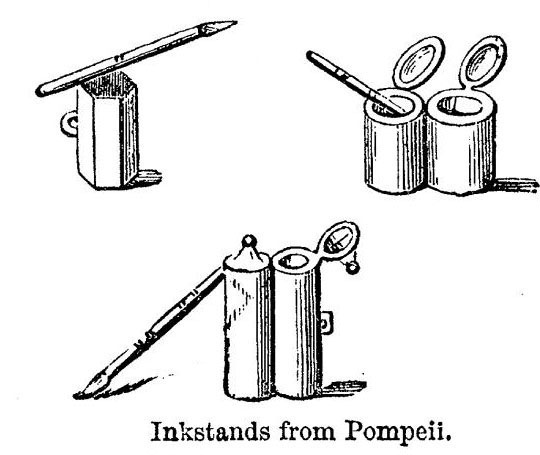
Atramentaria (inkstands) from Pompeii

Atramentum or atrament, generally means a very black, usually liquid, substance. For example, an octopus may emit a puff of atrament (see cephalopod ink).

In ancient Rome, the term atramentum signified any black colouring substance used for any purpose. The Romans distinguished three principal kinds of atramentum, one called librarium (or scriptorium), another called sutorium, the third tectorium (or pidorium).

Atramentum librarium was the writing ink of Roman times, atramentum sutorium was used by shoemakers for dyeing leather, and atramentum tectorium was used by painters for some purposes, apparently as a sort of varnish.

Atramentous is a related adjective which means "black as ink". Historically, to atrament something would mean to write something down with ink. The word atrament is related to modern English atrocious: both originate from Latin atrare, which presumably meant to make something black.

According to the Pigment Compendium, atramentum is a historical pigment or ink based on carbon black. The painter Apelles has been credited for making atramentum elephantinum by burning ivory, and Pliny the Elder in his Natural History comments on Apelles' skilled use of black varnish.

In one modern commercial usage of the word, atramentum is a deep black colouring substance manufactured by a reaction of an iron salt with tannic acid (the tannic acid for this purpose is often extracted from oak bark). It is a historically important black dye or pigment fundamentally different from carbon black or black iron oxide pigments. It was also sometimes called "ink stone". It appears greyish-black in water but the colour becomes very deep and lustrous in linseed oil.

The iron-based atramentum called iron gall ink was in popular use from about the 12th to 19th century. It is currently a subject of conservation effort since many valuable collections are written using it but it causes ink corrosion. In Jewish tradition, scribes made use of iron sulfate (chalcanthum) in writing Torah scrolls, which caused the corrosion of the ink.

== See also ==
- Ink
- Coprinopsis atramentaria
- Victaphanta atramentaria
