= Robert Ashley (writer) =

English barrister, translator, and writer

Robert Ashley (1565 – October 1641) was an English lawyer and translator during the reigns of Elizabeth I and James I, and a member of parliament for Dorchester.

== Biography ==
Ashley was the son of Anthony Ashley of Damerham, Hampshire, and Dorothy Lyte, daughter of John Lyte, Esq., of Lytes Cary of Somerset. He was the younger brother of Anthony Ashley, 1st Baronet of Wimborne St Giles, and the elder brother of Sir Francis Ashley of Dorchester. (Note: His elder brother, Sir Anthony Ashley, inherited the family estates at Wimborne St Giles. He was the grandfather of Anthony Ashley Cooper, 1st Earl of Shaftesbury.)

Ashley attended the Grammar School at Southampton under the headmaster Hadrian Saravia. At the age of 13 he continued his studies at Salisbury Cathedral School with Adam Hill. Anthony Wood says he became a fellow commoner of Hart Hall in 1580, and does not speak of his being a member of any other college in Oxford University, but according to Ashley's own autobiography he transferred first to Alban Hall, Oxford, and then to Magdalen Hall.

Ashley was granted his BA degree in 1582 and was named fellow at Magdalen College, Oxford in 1583. He was made Master of Arts in 1587. In 1588 he entered New Inn and was admitted to Middle Temple on 8 October 1588. He was called to the Bar on 24 October 1595 after travelling to France. His mind was too mercurial for law, and he gave himself to the study of Dutch, French, Spanish and Italian. "Finding the practice of law", says Wood, "to have ebbs and tides, he applied himself to the learning of the languages of our neighbours, to the end that he might be partaker of the wisdom of those nations, having been many years of this opinion, that as no one soil or territory yieldeth all fruits alike, so no one climate or region affordeth all kind of knowledge in full measure." (Note: Wood obtained this quotation from Ashley's translation of Miguel de Luna' Almansor, 1627 (signature long S4r).)

Ashley was elected member of parliament for Dorchester in 1597. He lived for many years in the Middle Temple, dying in October 1641, leaving no descendants. He was buried in the Temple Church. l

Ashley created a library of approximately 5000 volumes. He housed his book collection in his chambers at the Middle Temple where he had to rent a second room to accommodate it. He bequeathed his entire collection to the Middle Temple with an additional £300 to fund a librarian's post.

== Literary background and published works ==
Ashley, who translated works during the reigns of Elizabeth, James I, and Charles I of England is called by Wood in his Athenæ Oxonienses "an esquire's son and Wiltshire-man born". When Ashley was a boy he delighted in reading Bevis of Hampton, Guy of Warwick, Valentine and Orson, Arthur and the Knights of the Round Table, and later the Decameron of Boccace and the Heptameron of the Queen of Navarre. His principal works are:

- Urania, in Latin verse, London, 1589, quarto, translated from the French of Du Bartas
- The Interchangeable Course, 1594, folio, translated from the French of Louis le Roy
- Almansor, the learned and victorious King that conquered Spain, his Life and Death, London, 1627, quarto, translated from Spanish. (In the preface to Almansor he speaks of having been in the library of the Escorial, where, he says, he saw a glorious golden library of Arabian books.)
- Relation of the Kingdom of Cochin-China, containing many admirable rarities and singularities of that country, London, 1633, quarto, translated from the Italian of Christoforo Borri
- David Persecuted, translated from the Italian of Malvezzi, London, 1637

Ashley also translated Sebastián Fox Morcillo's De honore (Basel, 1556) into English as of Honour, but it was never published. Three manuscript copies of Honour exist: Trinity College Cambridge, R.14.20, Huntington Library, MS. Ellesmere 1117, and Bodleian Library Ashmole MS. 1148.

Ashley is also credited as main author of an unpublished miscellany, the Book of Magical Charms, Newberry MS 5017, though only identified as such in 2017.
