= Book of Magical Charms =

17th century handwritten occult book

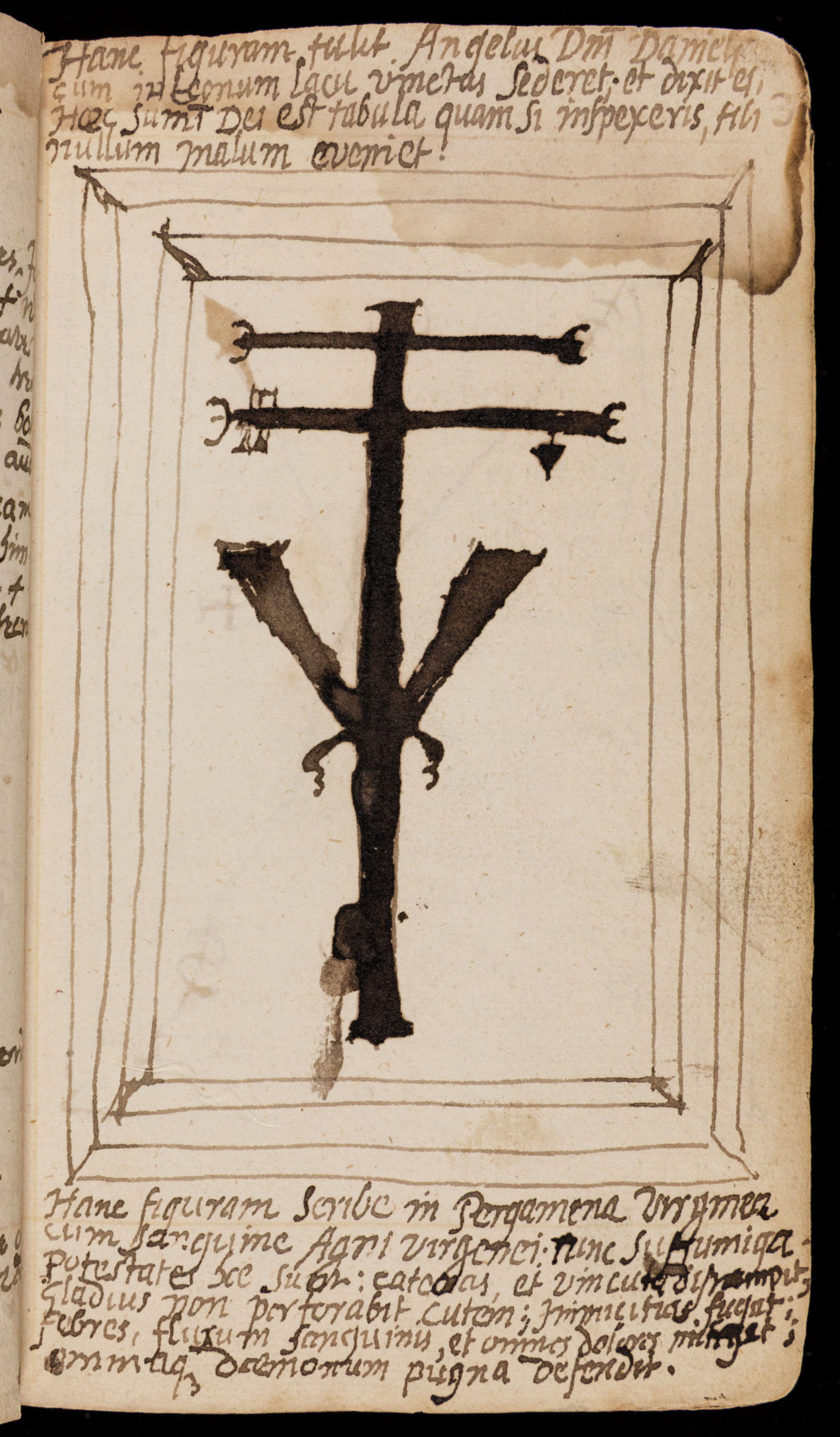
- Page seven of the Book of Magical Charms
- Author: Robert Ashley (suspected)
- Language: English, Latin
- Genre: Journal
- Publisher: Unpublished
- Publication place: England
- Pages: 285 leaves
- Newberry Library MS 5017

The Book of Magical Charms, is a handwritten occult commonplace book composed in England in the seventeenth century and currently in the holdings of the Newberry Library in Chicago, Illinois. Its author is suspected to be London attorney Robert Ashley.

== Details ==
The Book of Magical Charms original volume, that has dos-à-dos binding, has no title, nor any named author. "Book of Magical Charms" is the title assigned to it by the library staff who acquired it in 1988 along with a bundle of medical texts. Its pages were written using iron gall ink and likely a quill pen utilising Latin and archaic English. The book contains numerous passages regarding charms for things such as healing a toothache or recovering a lost voice as well as how to talk to spirits.

Although the book's principal author is not named, he was identified in 2017 from his handwriting as a London lawyer, Robert Ashley. Ashley likely composed the book over the course of his lifetime. No copies of the book were ever made.

The Newberry Library has made the book's pages available for the public to read and transcribe/translate. The library dates the book c.1600–1699, and the subjects covered as: medicine, magic, mysticism, and spagiric magic.
