= Dr. Grip =

Dr. Grip (Dokutā Gurippu in Japan) is a brand of mechanical pencil made by Pilot Pens based in Japan. The Dr. Grip style also comes in a pen variety. It is well known for its "deflection-deflection/knock system." For its ergonomic features, the Dr. Grip pencil has been awarded the Arthritis Foundation's "Commendation for Ease-of-Use."

== Features ==
The deflection-deflection system is a special form of lead advancement. A pencil using this system is also commonly known as a "shaker pencil". A small, metal weight lies around the core of the pencil, and when shaken, slides up and down; thus pushing the lead advancer down and advancing more lead.

For ergonomics, the Dr. Grip pencil was designed with a wide barrel and cushioned grip to relieve writing stress and fatigue.

== Models ==
The majority of Dr. Grip pencil models only differ in color. The "Center of Gravity" pencil is a slightly different model in that it's designed with a different weight distribution for more comfortable, balanced writing. It also has a wide double layer comfort grip to reduce writing stress. In the United States this pencil comes in a model using 0.7mm lead only. There is no knock system for the US model. In Japan the G-Spec Dr. Grip is available, which is the same pencil, but using 0.5mm lead with a knock system.

The pencils are available in 0.5mm and 0.7mm depending on the style of pencil.

=== List of Dr. Grip styles ===
- Dr. Grip
- LTD (US only) 0.5mm
- GEL
- Neon
- G-Spec (Japan only) 0.5mm
- Center of Gravity (US version of G-Spec, without knock system) 0.7mm
- OffRoader 0.5mm
- G-Spec white (Japan only) 0.5mm
- 4+1 (Japan only)
- Putimo [mini] (Japan only) 0.5mm
- Putimo Color [mini] (Japan only)
- Mini
- Sky-time 0.5mm
- Aroma (Japan only) 0.5mm
- Barazoku (Japan only)
- PlayBorder (Asia only) 0.5mm
- Frost Color Series (Japan only) 0.5mm
- FullBlack (Japan only) 0.5mm
- PureWhite (Japan only) 0.5mm
