= Montegrappa =

Italian manufacturing company of luxury goods

Elmo & Montegrappa S.p.A.
- Type: Private
- Industry: Writing implements
- Founded: 1912; 114 years ago
- Headquarters: Italy
- Products: Fountain pens, inks
- Website: montegrappa.com

Montegrappa is an Italian manufacturing company of luxury goods, based in Bassano del Grappa, a city in Veneto. Its full name is Elmo & Montegrappa S.p.A., and is renowned for its fine art-crafted fountain pens.

Montegrappa Harry Potter collection pens at Makoba pen store, Bengaluru (2026)

== History ==
Montegrappa was founded under the slogan "Manifattura pennini d'oro e penne stilografiche" ("Maker of gold nibs and fountain pens") in 1912. Its products are still manufactured in the original factory on the river Brenta, in Bassano del Grappa—near Vicenza, in the North-East of Italy.

During the First World War Bassano was a centre of military operations. Among the many soldiers who used the company's pens (Elmo at that time) for their correspondence were two celebrated 20th-century writers, Ernest Hemingway and John Dos Passos, who had both volunteered for service as ambulance drivers.

The company was at its high point in the 1930s. It was a period when the fountain pen became widespread and the products of the House of Bassano met the taste of the public with their sober design, the variety of their colours and materials (among the first to use celluloid and galalith), the operation of their technical solutions, and the originality and precision of their manufacturing techniques.

== Products ==
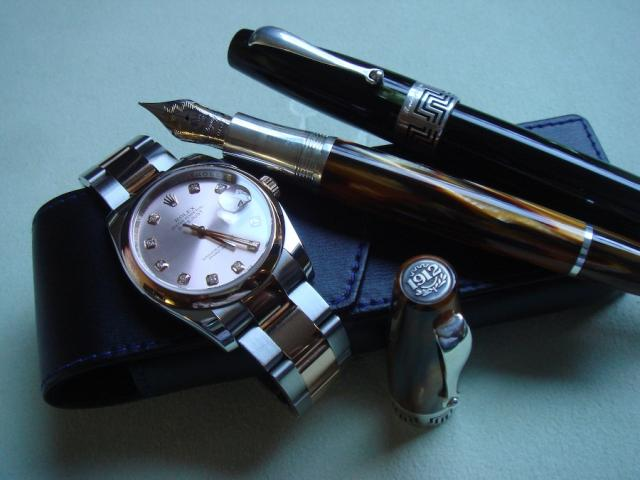
Montegrappa Extra 1930 Black Bamboo and Turtle Brown Fountain Pens

Other Montegrappa products were watches, cufflinks, pockets of leather, fragrances and accessories. The Montegrappa company is owned by Aquila's family: Sylvester Stallone and the ex-F1 Ferrari driver Jean Alesi are also partners and members of the board for P.R. and communication.

Montegrappa makes Regular Edition; Limited Edition; and Special Edition Pens. Pens come in three forms; rollerball; ballpoint or fountain. In addition to these forms, Montegrappa makes pens out of various precious materials; silver and gold are the most commonly used material.

Limited Edition Pens include: Alchemist; Aphrodite; Brain; Eternal Bird; 1995 Dragon; 2015 Dragon; Pele; Luxor; Classical Greece; Frank Sinatra; Amerigo Vespucci; Science and Nature; Tertio Millennio; Israel 50th; Romeo and Juliet; Lancaster and York; Vatican 2000; Il Millennio de Bassano; Batman; Tribute to Ayrton Senna; Mayan Calendar; My Guardian Angel; Harrods; Salvador Dalí; Bruce Lee; Pirates; Chaos; Gran Teatro Le Fenice; Barbiere Di Siviglia; Excellentia Lech Walesa; White Nights; 88th Anniversary; Kazan; Mysticum Count Cagliostra; Human Civilization; Cosmos Enigma; Invita a la Traviata; Citta D'arte Venezia; America's Cup; Quincy Jones; Alexander Hamilton; Special Reserve; Memory; 2000 Millennium; Muhammad Ali and Joe Fraser; La Serena; Sophia; United Arab Emirates; Paulo Coelho; Kahlil Gibran; Queen of Hearts; Animalia for Peace Parks; Animalia; and Euro 2002.

Montegrappa also made a series of Ferrari Pens; a series of Elvis Pens; a DC Comics series; and a golf edition.
