= Pilot (pen company) =

Japanese pen manufacturer

Pilot Corporation

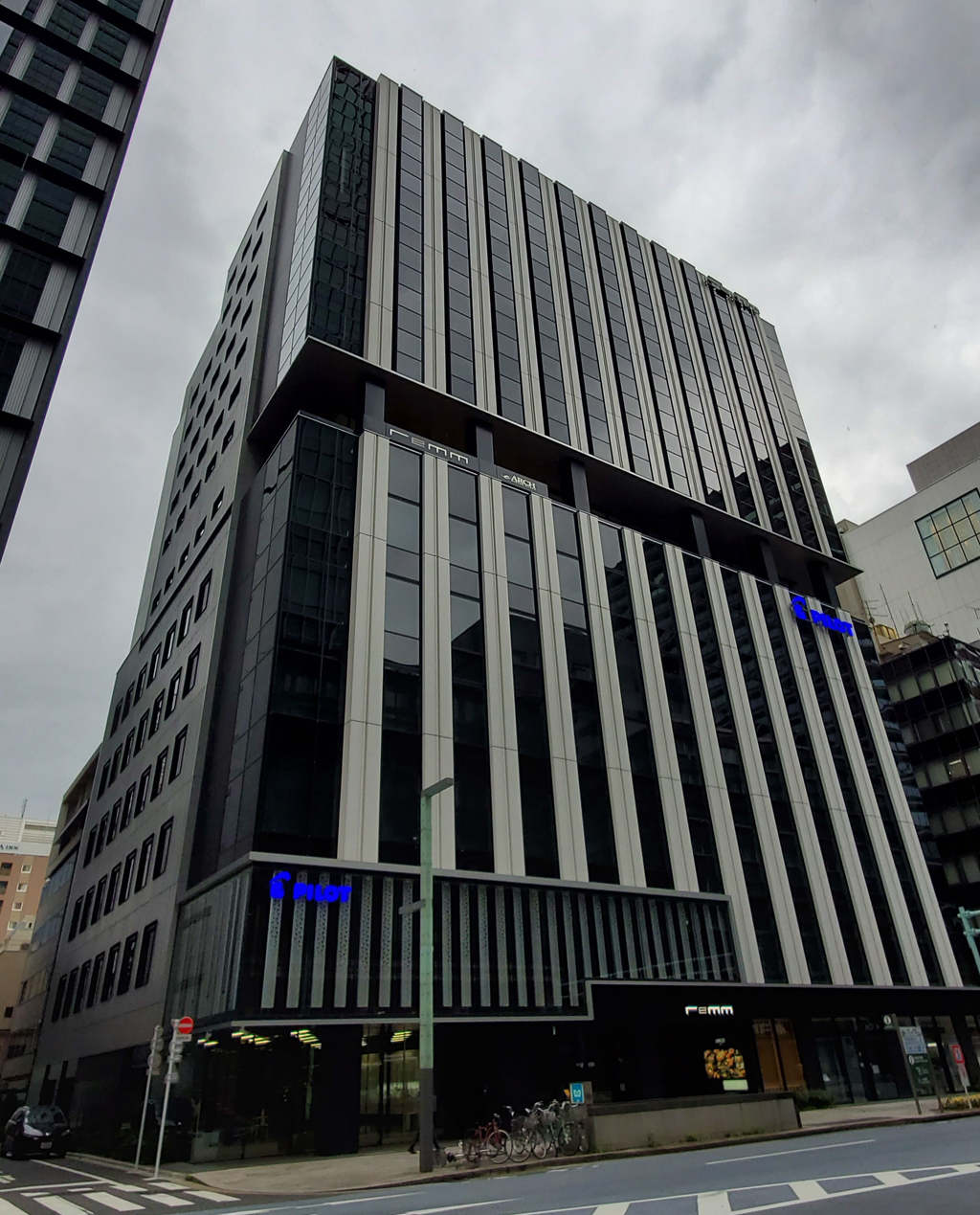
- Headquarters in Chūō, Tokyo
- Native name: 株式会社パイロットコーポレーション
- Romanized name: Kabushiki-gaisha Pairotto Kōporēshon
- Formerly: Pilot Group Holdings Corporation (2002-2003)
- Type: Public (K.K)
- Traded as: TYO: 7846
- Industry: Stationery
- Predecessor: Pilot Corporation; Pilot Ink; Pilot Precision
- Founded: January 4, 2002; 24 years ago
- Founder: Ryosuke Namiki
- Headquarters: Kyobashi, Chūō, Tokyo, Japan
- Area served: Worldwide
- Key people: Shu Itoh (President)
- Products: Writing implements
- Brands: G2, Precise, FriXion, Dr. Grip, Enso, Kaküno, Acroball, VBall, Varsity, Razor Point, Down Force, EasyTouch, Axiom
- Revenue: ▲¥118.60 billion (2023)
- Operating income: ▼¥19 billion (2023)
- Total assets: ▲¥166.47 billion (2023)
- Number of employees: 1,056 (2023)
- Website: pilotpen.com

Pilot Corporation (株式会社パイロットコーポレーション, Kabushiki Gaisha Pairotto Kōporēshon) is a Japanese pen manufacturer based in Tokyo. It produces writing instruments, stationery and jewellery, but is best known for its pens.

It is the largest pen manufacturer in Japan, with competition globally from other pen companies like Japanese Pentel Co., Mitsubishi Pencil Co. (Uni-ball), French Bic and American Paper Mate. Pilot has many subsidiaries throughout the world, including in the Philippines, United Kingdom, Indonesia, Malaysia, India, Brazil, South Africa, Germany, Mexico, South Korea, United States, Russia, Australia, Italy and France. Most Pilot pens are made in Japan, France and the United States. Namiki, Pilot's fountain pens with maki-e lacquering designs, are made in the Hiratsuka factory.

== History ==
In 1915, Ryōsuke Namiki (並木良輔), a professor from Tokyo Nautical College in Japan, left his job to found a small factory near Tokyo to produce gold pen nibs. In 1916, Namiki expanded his product line and became a full-fledged manufacturer of writing instruments.

The Pilot Pen Corporation was founded by Ryosuke Namiki with Masao Wada (和田正雄) in 1918 under the name of the Namiki Manufacturing Company.

In 1926 it established overseas offices in Malaysia, Singapore, Boston, London and Shanghai. In 1938 the name of the company changed to the Pilot Pen Co., Ltd. It was again renamed in 1950 as the Pilot Ink Company, Ltd. In 1954 a branch was opened in Brazil. From 1972 to 1999 various sub-companies were formed to cover the various branches, and the collective name for these is Pilot Corporation. More recently, Pilot began the BeGreen range of pens and pencils which are composed of mostly recycled content.

In 1995 and 1996, they raced a Ferrari F40 LM at the 24 Hours of Le Mans. The racing team that entered the F40 LM was at first named Pilot-Aldix Racing, but was soon named under Pilot Pen Racing and Pilot Racing. It won at the 4 Hours of Anderstorp and finished 12th at Le Mans.

Pilot created the Aquadoodle drawing toy for children with disappearing hydrochromic ink. Aquadoodle was marketed through a partnership with Spin Master beginning in 2003, and won the American Toy of the Year award.

In 2018 Pilot celebrated the company's 100th anniversary with a number of special pages to its website and special edition pens.

In 2023, Pilot ended its forty-year-old partnership with Indian stationery company Luxor Writing Instruments, and is set to enter the Indian market individually.

== Products ==
=== Fountain pens ===
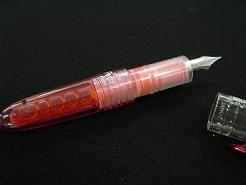
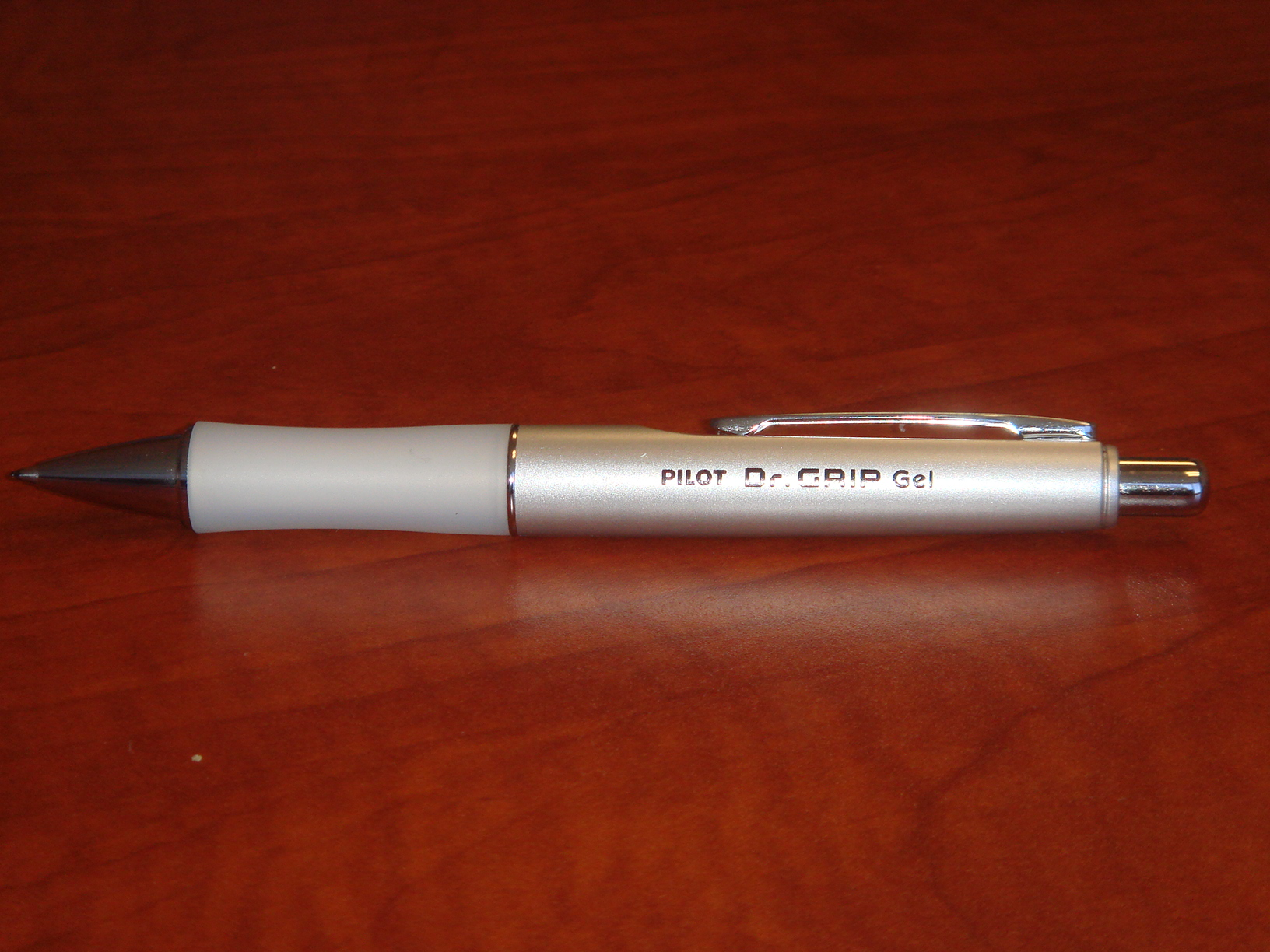
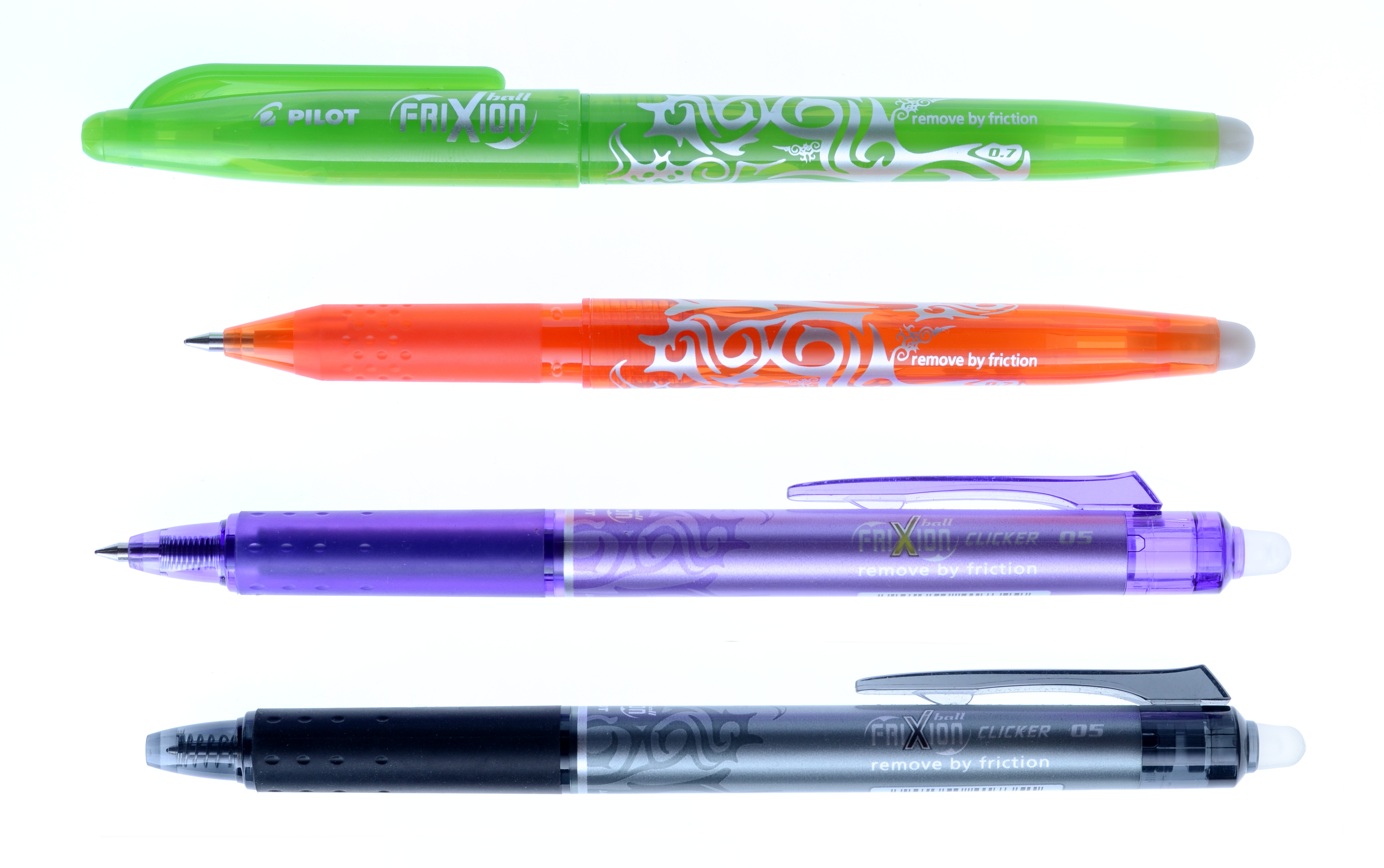
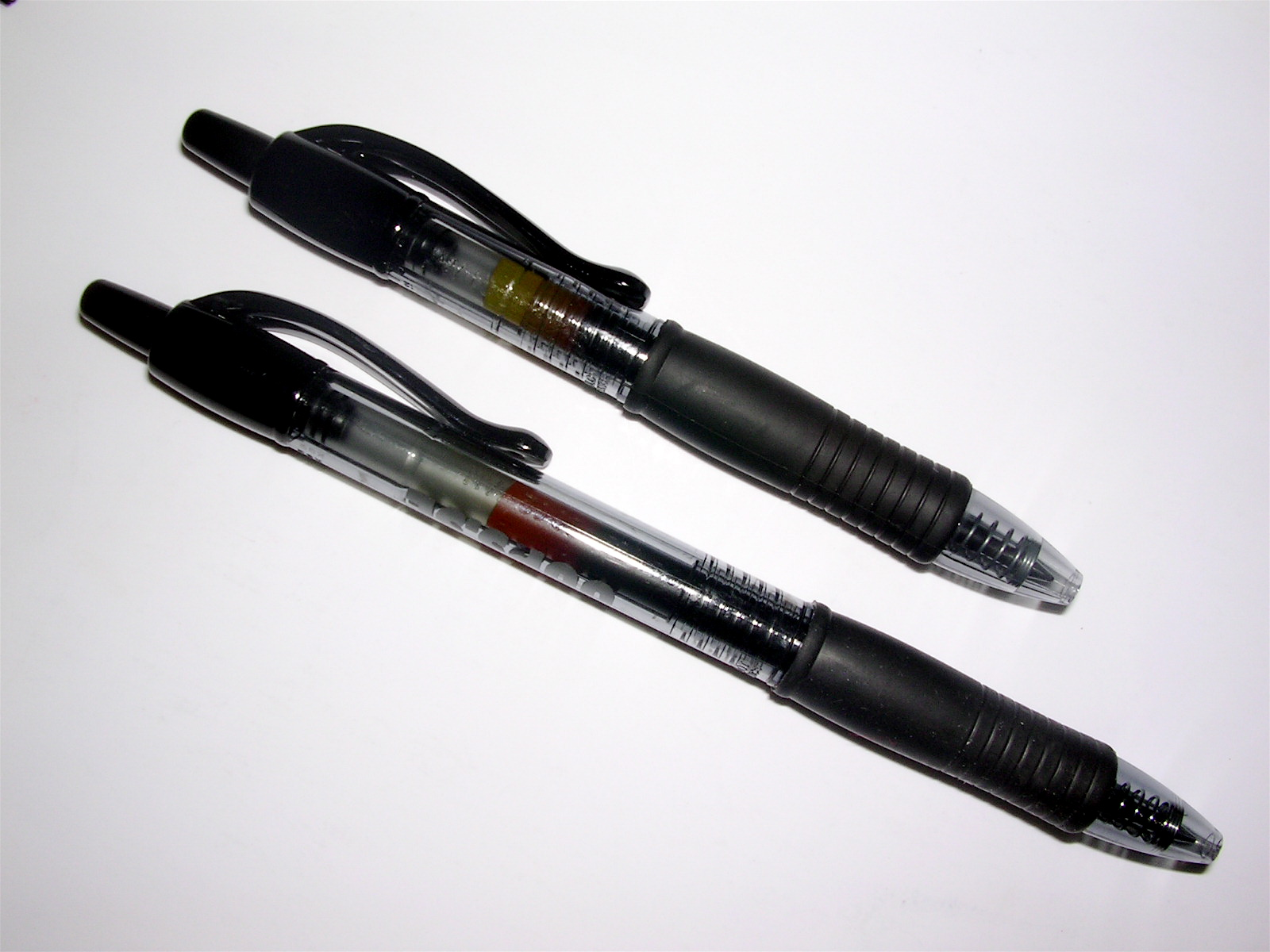
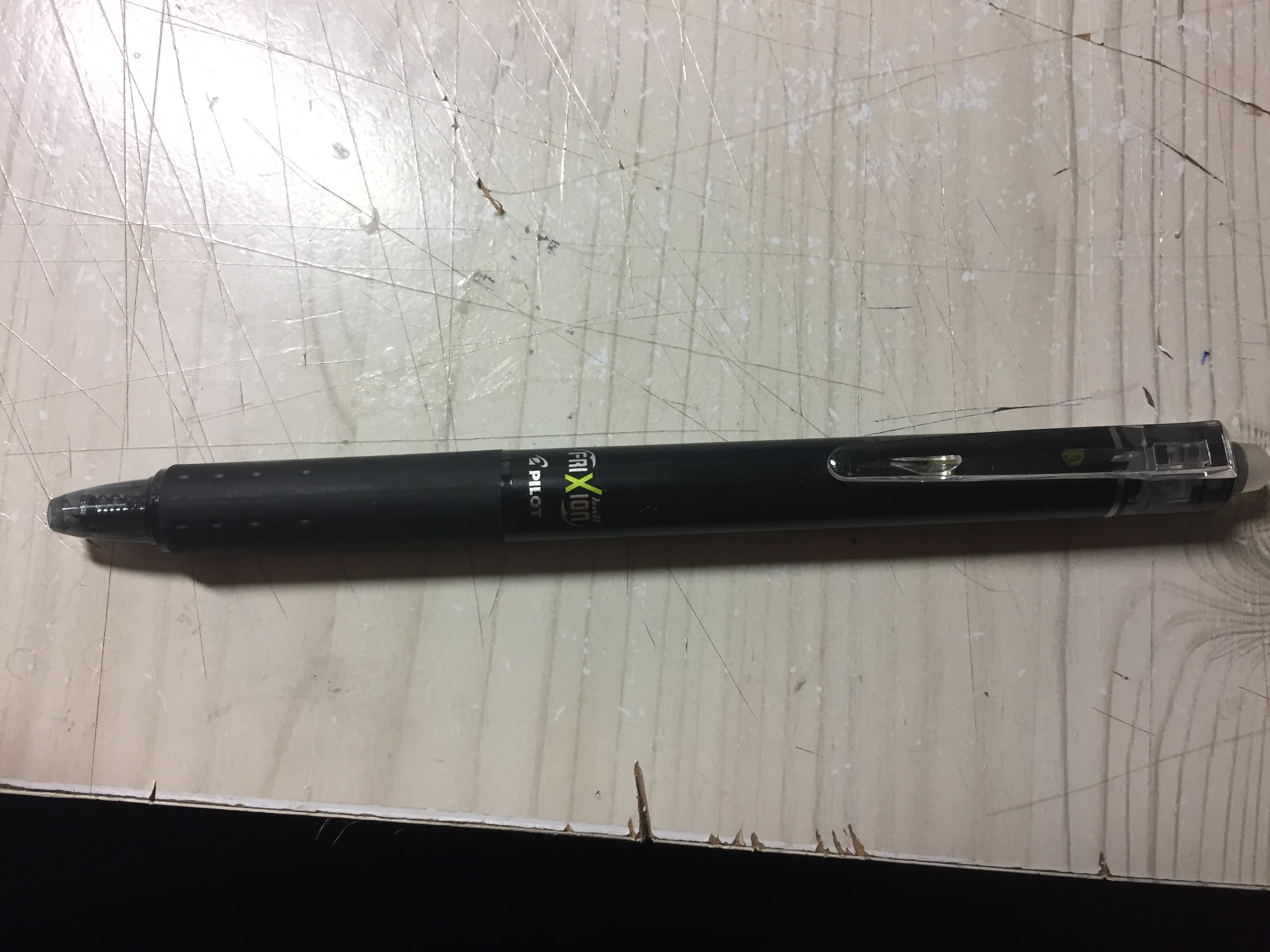
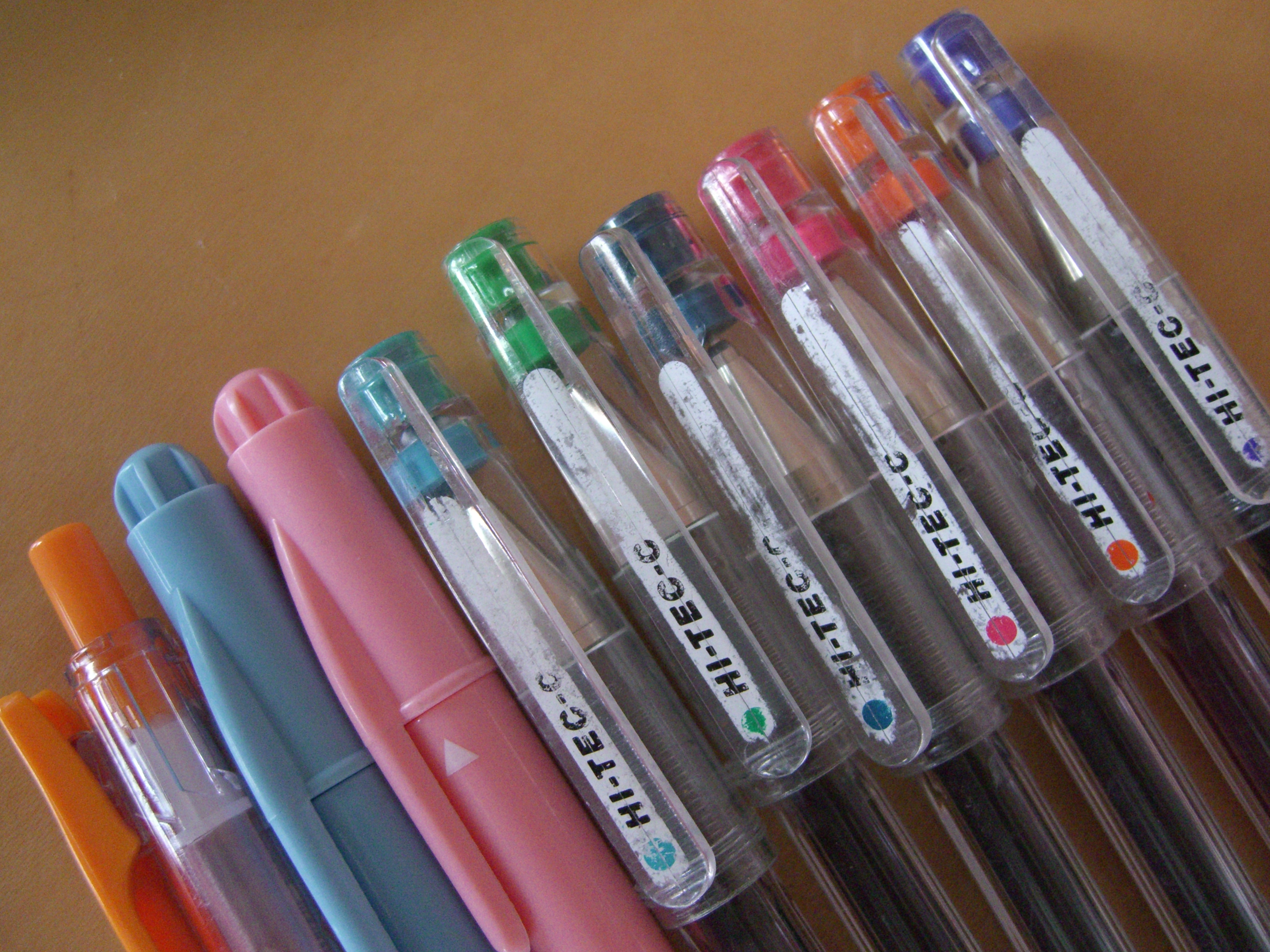
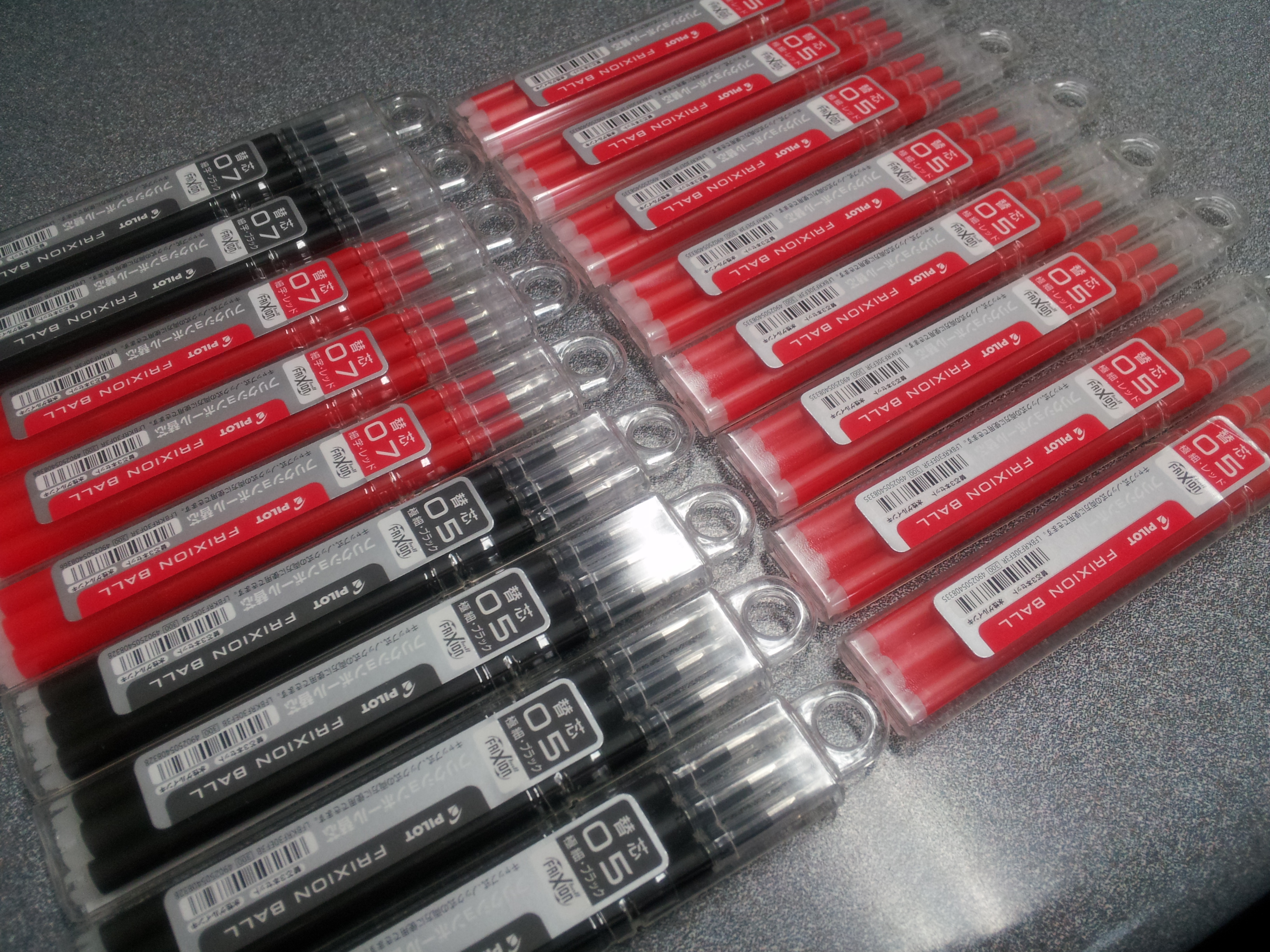
Fltr, (above): Petit1 fountain pen, Dr. Grip gel pen, 0.25mm Hi-Tec-C gel pen; (middle): FriXion erasable pens, (Note: These pens have a mechanism for which their gel ink become transparent by erasing-friction heat; "When you rub the ink with the hard rubber eraser, heat from the resulting friction causes a temperature-sensing compound to activate an acid compounds, thus neutralizing the dye.") G-2 07 and G-2 XS roller gel ink pens; FriXion ball pens; (below): Hi-Tec-C color pens, FriXion ball pen refills

In 1963, Pilot Corporation introduced the Capless. Unlike other fountain pens during its time, the Pilot Capless featured a fully retractable nib. The Capless was later reintroduced as the Vanishing Point in 1972. In 2012, the company released the Metropolitan (known as Cocoon in Japan), a popular entry-level fountain pen. The Varsity is a disposable fountain pen that is pre-loaded with ink, while the Prera is a smaller pocket pen. Other offerings include the Pilot Falcon, which has a semi-flexible gold nib. The Kaküno, is a beginner fountain pen meant for children, that is often sold in fun colors, and has a smiley face on the fountain pen's nib.

==== Pilot Custom Pens ====
Some of Pilot's higher-end pens bear the name of "Custom" or "Custom Heritage" and a two or three digit number. "Custom" models are cigar-shaped, while "Custom Heritage" models have flat tops and bottoms, exceptions being the Custom 845 Urushi and the Custom Urushi, which have flat tops and bottoms, but are named simply "Custom". The number is based on the year of introduction (from the foundation of the company; the Custom 74 was introduced in 1992) for models with two digits, while the third digit on models with three digits represents a list price when multiplied by ¥10,000 (the Custom 823 was introduced in 2000 when it cost ¥30,000).

Models include:

- Custom K. Introduced in 1971. A resin version was added to the range in 1972.
- Custom Grandee Tomo. Introduced in 1978. Clip has a split.
- Custom 67. Introduced in 1985.
- Custom 74. Introduced in 1992.
- Custom 742. Introduced in 1993.
- Custom 743. Introduced in 1993.
- Custom 823. Introduced in 2000. Equipped with a plunger ink suction mechanism.
- Custom 845 Urushi. Introduced in 2002.
- Custom Heritage 91. Introduced in 2009. Cartridge or converter.
- Custom Heritage 92. Introduced in 2010. Piston filler.
- Custom Urushi. Introduced in 2016.

=== Inks ===
==== Fountain pen ====
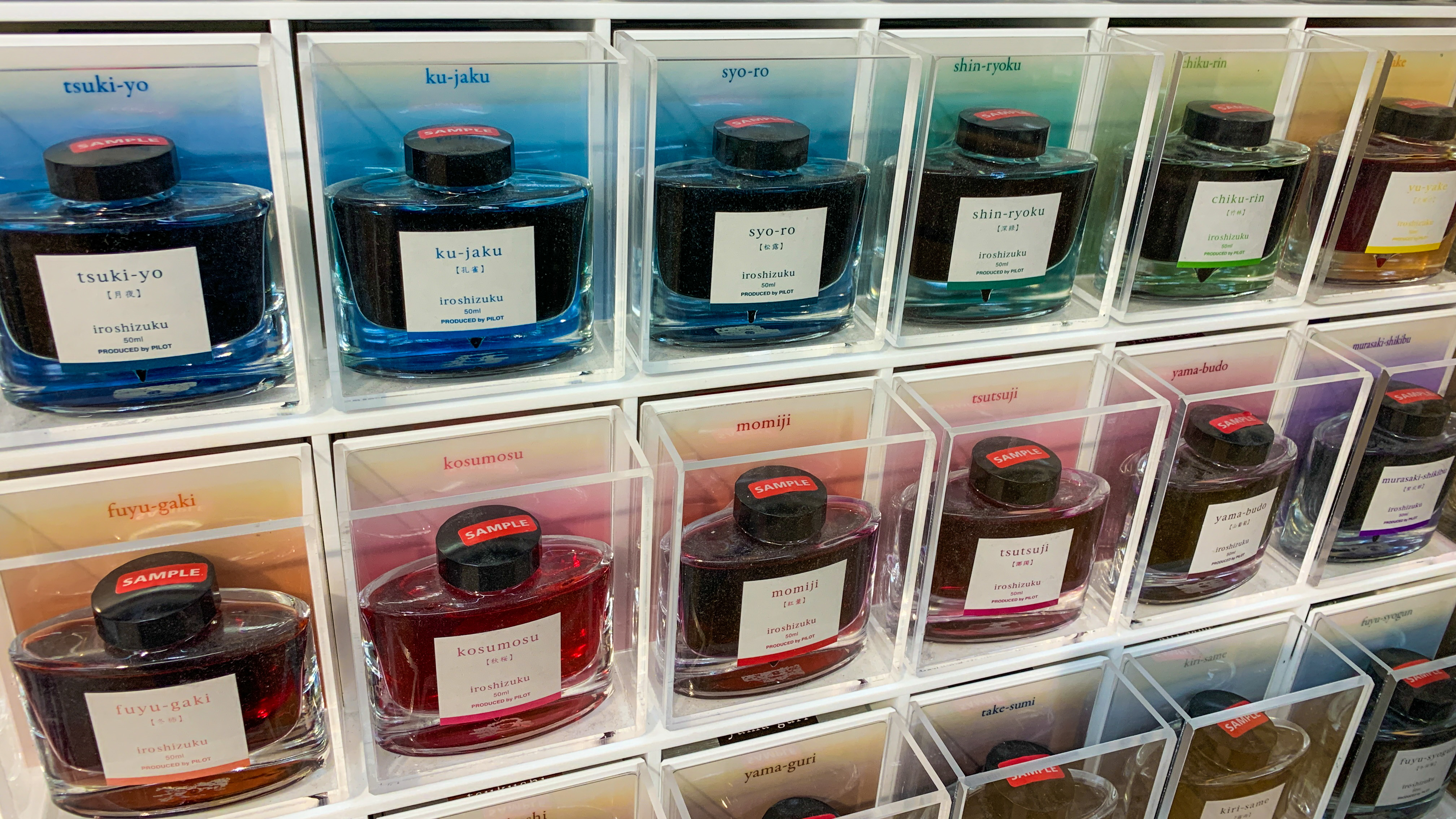
Iroshuzuku on sale in Tokyo

- Namiki: Pilot's basic line of ink. Some are available in bottles, while all in Pilot's proprietary cartridge format.
- Parallel Mixable Color: A line of 12 colors, only available in Pilot's proprietary cartridge format. These cartridges are intended for use in the Pilot Parallel Pen, a calligraphy pen designed to mix the content of two different cartridges while writing.
- Iroshizuku (15 ml, 50 ml):
  - Core range created by Kiyomi Hasegawa with 21 colours introduced from 2007. The name Iroshizuku is a blend of two different Japanese words. "Iro" meaning coloured, and "shizuku" meaning dew or drop. Range now comprises 24 themes of "beautiful scenery of Japan". All are available as bottled inks. A number are also available in Pilot's proprietary cartridge format.
  - Three Tokyo Limited Edition inks were introduced in 2009 at a few limited retailers in Tokyo. These were re-issued more widely in 2016 and again in 2020.
  - Seven limited edition inks inspired by the seven gods of good fortune were issued in 2018 to celebrate the 100th anniversary of Pilot inspired by the seven gods of good fortune.

Iroshizuku Range	Name	English	Introd.	Disc.	Image	Note
Core	ama-iro	Sky Blue	2012			(Note: Also available in cartridge format.)
Core	ajisai	Hydrangea	2007			
Core	asa-gao	Morning Glory	2007			
Core	chiku-rin	Bamboo Forest	2011			
Core	fuyu-syogun	Old Man Winter	2008			
Core	fuyu-gaki	Winter Persimmon	2009			
Core	hana-ikada	Cherry Blossom	2021			
Core	hotaru-bi	Firefly Glow	2021			
Core	ina-ho	Rice Ear	2011	2021		
Core	kiri-same	Scotch Mist / Autumn Shower	2008	2024		
Core	kon-peki	Deep Cerulean Blue	2007			
Core	kosumosu	Cosmos	2011	2024		
Core	ku-jaku	Peacock	2008			
Core	momiji	Autumn Leaves	2008			
Core	murasaki-shikibu	Japanese Beautyberry	2011			
Core	rikka	Snow Crystal	2024			
Core	shin-kai	Deep Sea	2012			
Core	shin-ryoku	Forest Green	2008			
Core	sui-gyoku	Emerald Green	2021			
Core	sho-ro	Dew on Pine Tree	2008			
Core	syun-gyo	Spring Dawn	2024			
Core	take-sumi	Bamboo Charcoal	2012			
Core	tsuki-yo	Moonlight	2007			
Core	tsukushi	Horsetail	2009	2021		
Core	tsutsuji	Azalea	2008	2024		
Core	tsuyu-kusa	Asiatic Dayflower	2007	2021		
Core	to-ro	Warm lantern	2024			
Core	yama-budo	Crimson Glory Vine	2008			
Core	yama-guri	Wild Chestnut	2009			
Core	yu-yake	Sunset	2008			
Tokyo limited edition	edo-murasaki		2009			
Tokyo limited edition	fukagawa-nezu		2009			
Tokyo limited edition	shimbashi-iro		2009			
100th anniversary limited edition	benzai-ten		2018			
100th anniversary limited edition	bishamon-ten		2018			
100th anniversary limited edition	daikokut-en		2018			
100th anniversary limited edition	ebisu		2018			
100th anniversary limited edition	hoteison		2018			
100th anniversary limited edition	fuku-roku-ju		2018			
100th anniversary limited edition	juro-jin		2018			

==== Other ====
- Drawing ink (30ml, 350ml), securities ink (30ml): It is an ink for each application and is used with a pen or brush.

=== Pens from recycled bottles ===
Pilot Corporation published some ecological facts about its pens in 2015. The most eco-friendly is the Bottle-2-Pen (B2P) which is made of 89% and 86% recycled components for gel and ink varieties respectively. PET plastic from bottles are used for much of it, so it is sometimes nicknamed the 'PetPen' or 'PetBall'.

=== Others ===
The brand manufactures and commercializes a wide range of products under its own name and other brands, such as FriXion (erasable ink gel pens, highlighters, and stamps), Acroball (hybrid ink ballpoint pens); Pintor; B2P and Begreen (both, products with recycled components).

Sub-brands include Better, Rex-Grip, Super Grip G (oil-based ballpoint); Precise, Hi-Tecpoint (rollerballs); Hi-Tec-C, Juice (or Pop'lol) (gel pens); and Coleto (customizable multi-pen system); Mogulair, Dr. Grip series, Super Grip, Fure Fure (2020) series (mechanical pencils); Automac (mechanical pencil equipped with automatic function); S series: S3, S5, S10, S20, S30 (drafting pencils).

The following table contains the Pilot product lines in Asia, Europe, and North and South America, as of December 2019:

Category	Products
Writing implements	Ballpoint, rollerball, gel, needle point and fountain pens, markers, highlighters, mechanical pencils, refills, digital pens
Accessories	Erasers, correction fluids, inks
