= Stark's ink =

Type of homemade ink

Stark's ink is one of a number of types of homemade inks whose recipes were widely available in the 19th century. People often made their own ink before commercially available ink was inexpensively and easily obtainable. James Stark was a chemist during the 19th century who experimented with ink recipes for 23 years. He tested 229 recipes for their durability on various kinds of paper to find the most stable iron gall ink recipe. He submitted his findings in 1855 to the Society of Arts in Edinburgh, Scotland. This recipe was the one he personally used.

== Recipe ==
This iron gall ink recipe is taken from the Household Cyclopedia of General Information, published in 1881. It is not in common use now, though the preparation of inks with similar methods was common at one time.

Recipe for one imperial gallon (4.5 L) of ink:
- 12 ounces (340 g), nut-galls
- 8 ounces (230 g), sulfate of indigo
- 8 ounces (230 g), copperas
- 4 to 6 ounces (110 to 170 g) of gum arabic
- A few cloves

The addition of the sulfate of indigo renders the ink less stable on the page and prone to premature browning over time, but less liable to mould in the inkwell. It is blue when first written with, but soon becomes an intense black.

The ink can be made without the sulfate of indigo, which will make it considerably less expensive yet more archival. Without it, the ink will appear pale initially then quickly blacken as it dries. The ink is very permanent and waterproof.

== See also ==
- Iron gall ink
