= Diamine Inks Limited =

Diamine Speciality Inks Limited
- Company type: Limited Company
- Industry: Writing Inks and Stamp Pads
- Predecessor: Diamine Inks Limited; T. Webster & Co.
- Founded: 1864; 161 years ago in London and Liverpool
- Founder: Thomas Webster
- Website: diamineinks.co.uk

Diamine Inks Limited has been producing inks since 1864. It is one of the last surviving writing ink producers in Britain.

== History ==
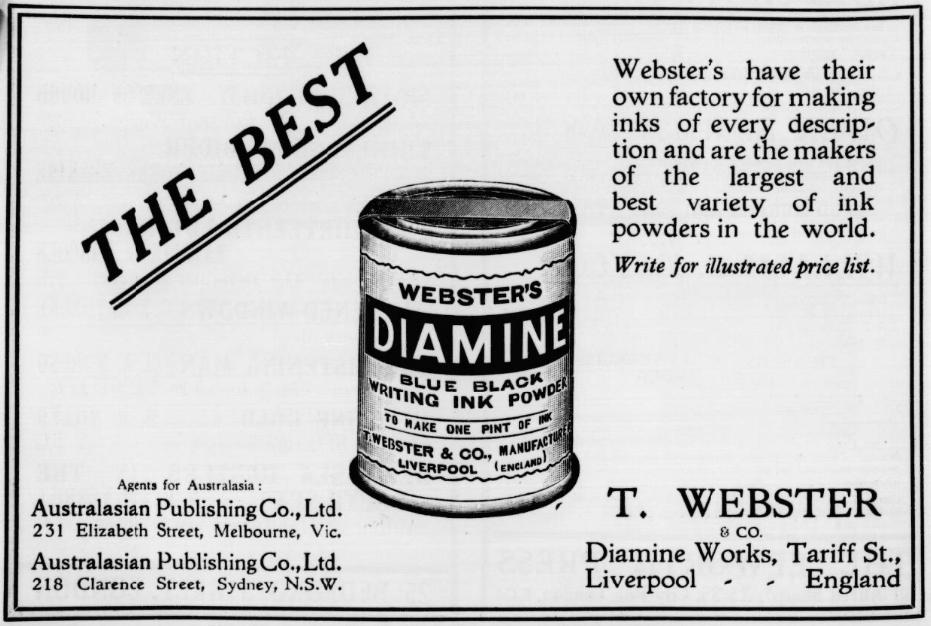
From the Bookseller Thursday 13 March 1924

The company was founded in London in 1864 as T. Webster and Co. in London, and in Liverpool from 1868. Thomas Webster based production in Liverpool and initially was in partnership with John Dyas. By 1871 they were at 11a South Castle West and Vauxhall Works but the partnership was dissolved in 1874. Thomas Webster continued as T. Webster & Co. In 1880 the business launched its new ink, Diamine. By 1881 the business was based at 11 & 13 Henry Street, Liverpool.

Between 1901 and 1911 production moved to new premises in Tariff Street, Liverpool, and the ‘Diamine Works’ here were extended in 1925.

In 1924 the business acquired the assets of the Polygon Manufacturing Company Limited of Bonner Street, London. Production of Polygon products was continued and the business maintained an office in London at Diamine House, Middle Lane, Hornsey.

The company later became part of the M.B.F. Group. In 2005 the company changed its name from Diamine Inks Limited to Diamine-Speciality Inks Limited.

== Thomas Webster ==
The founder of the company was born in 1839 in Bootle, Lancashire. Educated at Bruch Hall School, Warrington. He married Mary Alice Grace, daughter of John Grace of Liverpool, on 12 August 1875 at Christ Church, Bootle. They had the following children

- Hedley Webster (b. 1877)
- Reginald Webster (5 Jan 1878 - 25 Oct 1953)
- Grace Elizabeth Webster (1880–1886)
- Hannah Webster (b. 1885)

== Reginald Webster ==
When his father stepped down from the business, his son Reginald Webster took control. Reginald was born on 5 Jan 1878 and married Salome Marsh (1884–1975) on 15 March 1915 in St John's Church, Waterloo, Lancashire.
