= Parker Jointless =

Fountain pen line made by Parker Pen Company

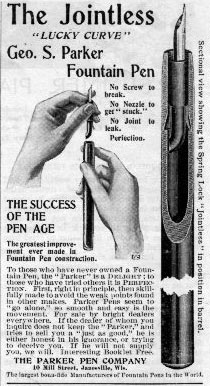
An 1898 advertisement for the pen

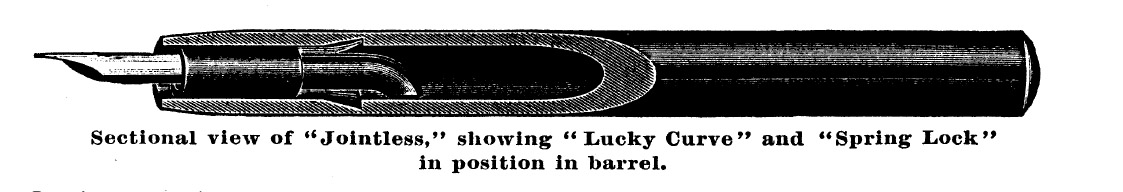
Jointless and spring lock

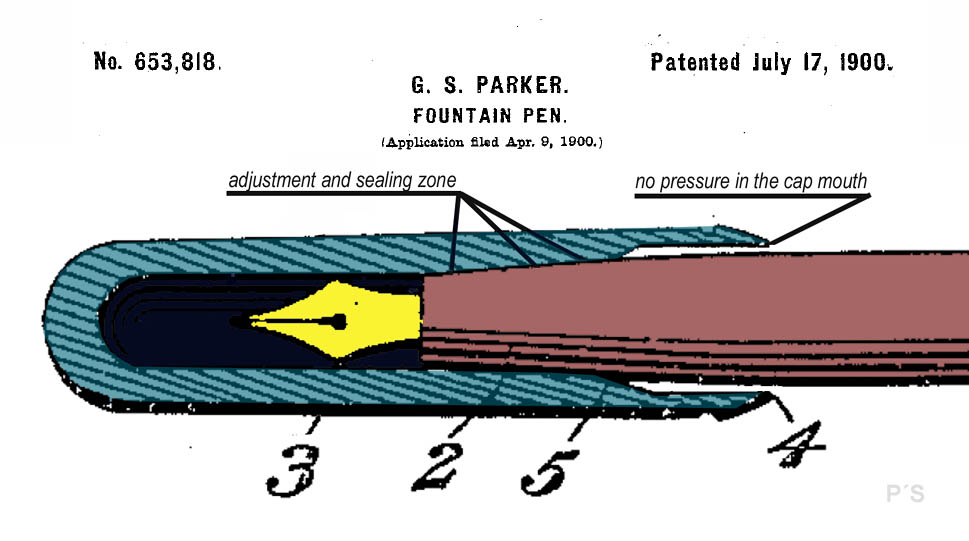
Parker anti-break cap US653,818 patent

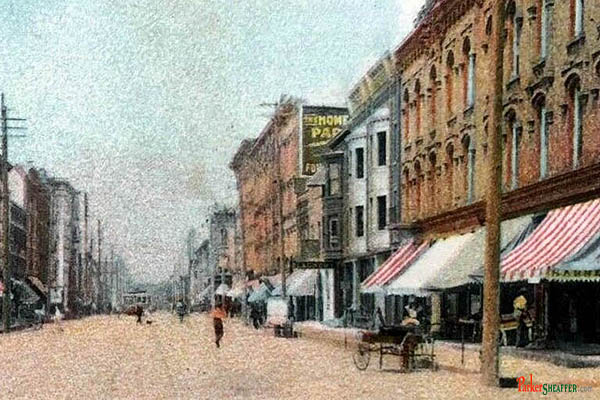
Parker Pen Company at 17–19 South Main Street, Janesville

The Parker Jointless "Lucky Curve" is a range of fountain pens released by the Parker Pen Company in late 1897. The pen used the Lucky Curve ink supply system, designed to draw ink even when the pen was not in use, which was invented and patented by George Safford Parker in 1894. The pen was named "Jointless" because of its one-piece ink barrel, designed to prevent leakage. The pen was Parker's first to be advertised outside the United States. The American government purchased the pens in large quantities and a Parker Jointless was one of the pens used to sign the Spanish–American Treaty of Paris in 1898.

In 1894 and following successive improvements to his 1889 patent, George S. Parker perfected the Curve Tubular Overfeed. In 1896 this device would be improved and adapted as underfeed in the #2X Parker models according with Patent No. 606,231, which came to be known as Lucky Curve. This innovative element established a continuous capillary connection between the nib and the inner walls of the barrel avoiding some of the particular problems that, in its time, had the use of fountain pens; difficulty starting the ink flow when starting to write; poor, excessive, or uneven ink flow; ink dripping from the pen when the reservoir was not full or nearly empty, and ink overflowing through the section when the pen was reversed after use.

== See also ==
- Parker Duofold – Fountain pen produced by Parker Pen Company
- Parker Jotter – Retractable ballpoint pen
- Quink – Parker fountain pen ink
- Writing implement – Tool used for writing
