= Parker Jotter =

Retractable ballpoint pen

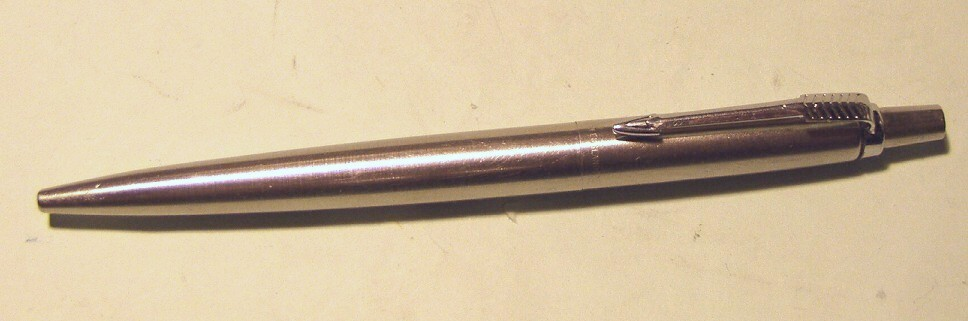
- Parker Jotter in stainless steel (flighter) model
- Type: Ballpoint pen
- Inception: 1954; 72 years ago
- Manufacturer: Parker Pen Company
- Available: Yes
- Website: parker.pen/jotter

The Parker Jotter is a retractable ballpoint pen manufactured by Parker Pen Company. The first was the Hopalong Cassidy Parkette ballpoint made for children. Since 1954, over 750 million have been sold worldwide. It is priced between $6 for lower end models, and $20 for higher end models, such as special editions. Its refill has a ballpoint tip originally called the T-Ball (for tungsten), with a unique textured surface that greatly reduces slipping and failure to transfer ink onto slick paper, known as "skipping". The technology is now commonly used in the pen industry. The pens are also a popular advertising medium. The external design of the Parker T-Ball refill is a configuration copied by many other brands of refillable pens.

== Description ==
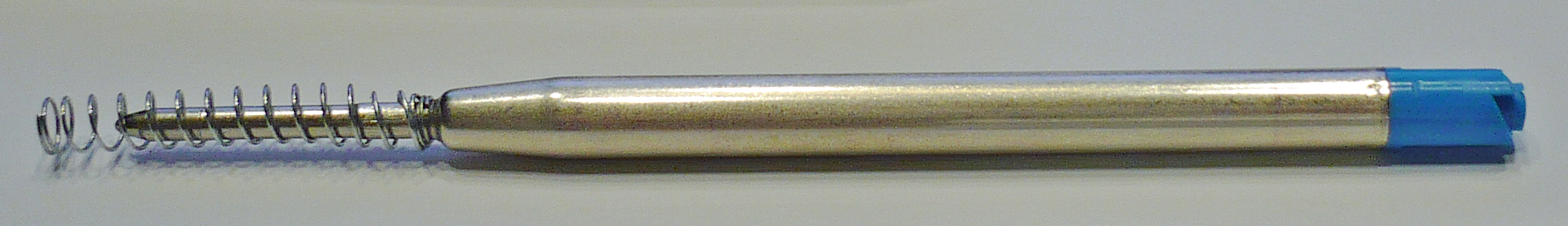
Parker-style G2 large capacity ballpoint refill

The Jotter is distinguished by a plunger and cap made of stainless steel, a stylized arrow-shaped clip, a plastic or metal barrel and a metal tip end. When introduced in 1954, the pen barrels were made from grooved nylon. Approximately a year later when new colors were introduced, the barrels were manufactured from 'Hercocel W' (cellulose acetate) which was more adaptable to the needs of Parker's marketing department (it could be heat stamped, engraved or imprinted). Originally, the barrels were produced in black, grey, green and red (rust). More colors were introduced in 1955, i.e. turquoise, coral, blue, charcoal, gold (mustard yellow) and grey-green. Shortly after introduction an additional model with a stainless steel barrel was added to the line and marketed as the Laboratory Jotter.

In over 70 years of production, the Jotter has been produced in numerous shades, some quite rare. To date it is estimated that more than 100 different colors have been manufactured.

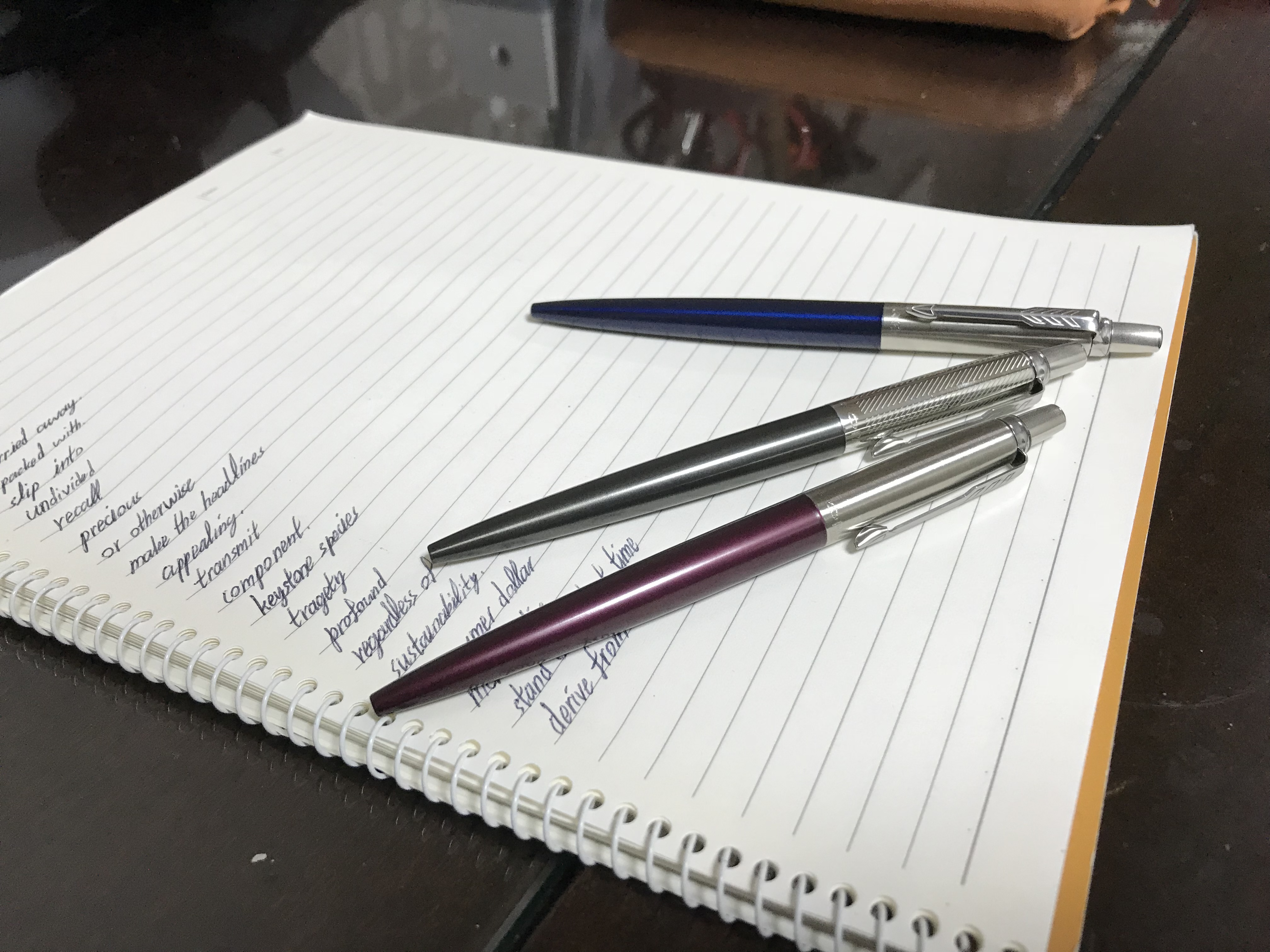
The redesigned Jotter

The so-called "girl's" Jotter was a smaller version of the original. It was manufactured in the early 1960s and was popular for a time. It came in several colors including black.

The Jotter has been manufactured in Canada, England, France, Australia, Brazil, West Germany, Peru, Colombia, Mexico, India, China and Argentina.

The refill comes in ball-pen and gel styles in multiple colors, as well as in three point sizes. Early in the history of the pen, refills were also available in extra fine and extra extra fine, but were soon discontinued. Boxed sets have been manufactured since inception.

== History ==
The Jotter ballpoint pen was introduced in 1954. The model had a "V" style clip without the arrow engraving. The 1954 Jotter came with red, green, light gray, dark gray and black barrels, made of grooved nylon, not smooth plastic. The following year, because of the popularity of the pen, the choice of colors was extended to include bright red, mustard yellow, bright green and bright orange. There are also cap variations resulting from differences in imprints, most noticeably the introduction of the Parker arrow logo and two sizes of the "MADE IN USA" imprint. Towards the end of production, smooth barrels were introduced without a metal tip. These proved to be prone to splitting and a metal tip was incorporated to improve durability. These barrels are also found with the early so-called "21" variety.

In 1956, the company made the Jotter barrel smooth plastic and changed the clip to the "21" style. This clip used a reversed "V" rather than an inverted one and incorporated a ball on the clip for pocket retention. This clip remained in use for approximately two years. During the period this variation was in production a metal barrel end (or tip) was added in response to complaints that the early plastic tip broke from pressure. Barrels and caps were all interchangeable during this period.

During this period (1956–1970) a Jotter was introduced with a substantially larger diameter barrel. This model was known as the "Industrial Jotter" as opposed to the standard diameter version known as the "Commercial Jotter". These industrial versions are seldom seen and can be recognized by the sharp taper at the end of the pen barrel.

In 1957, the company launched the T-Ball refill, which contained reformulated ink and a textured tungsten carbide writing ball. One year later, the company added an arrow to replace the ball-clip design. The arrow has remained on all production Jotters since.

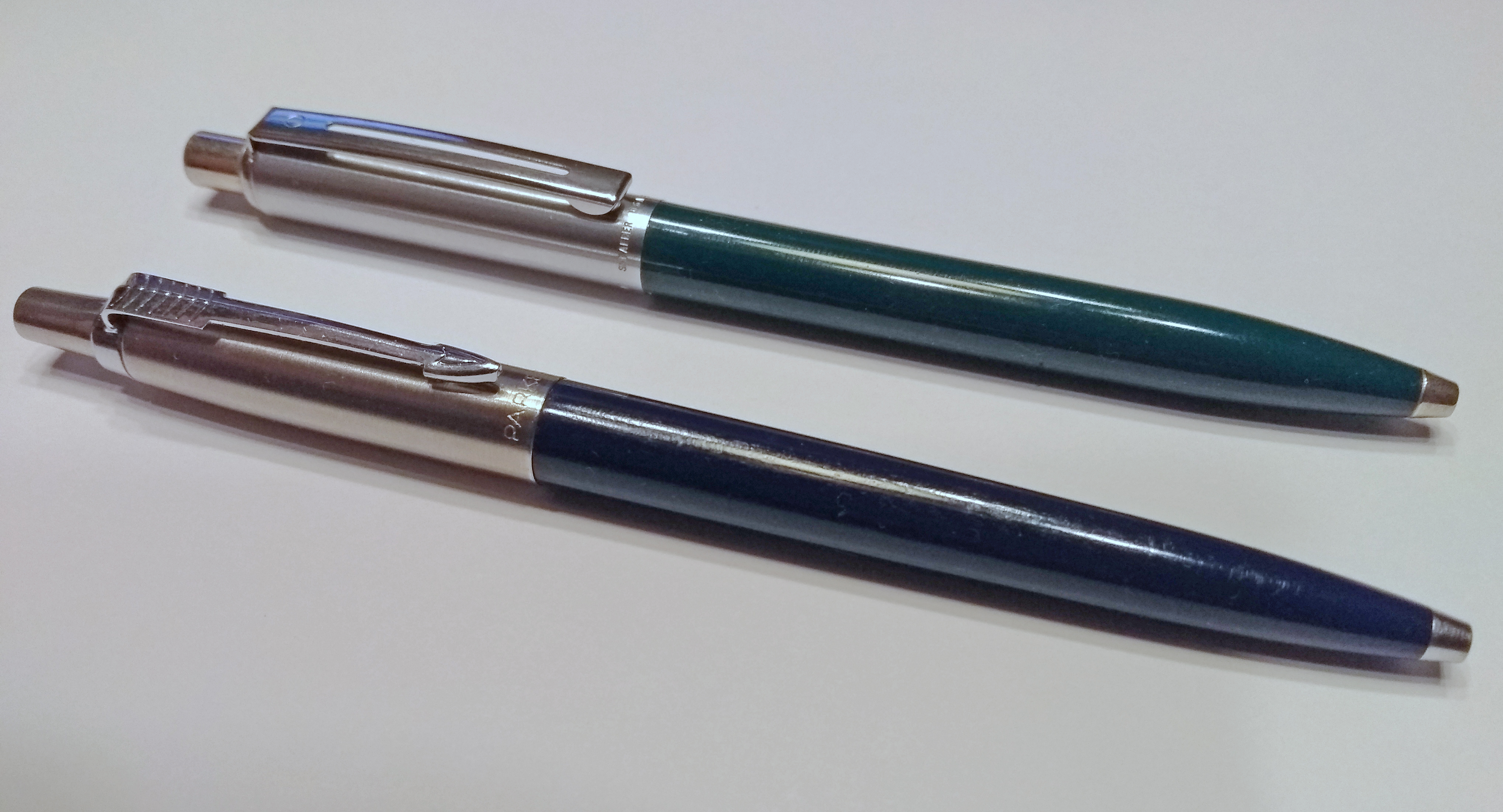
Parker Jotter featuring discontinued brass inner cap threads in front of a Sheaffer Sentinel

Today's Jotters are similar to the popular "ruggedized" version that first came out in 1954 when Parker salesmen stood on the nylon barrel to show its durability. Production has continued at Parker's plant in Newhaven, England, after being transferred there from Janesville, Wisconsin, USA, in 1999. Parker closed its factory in England late in 2010 and production was moved to Nantes, France. Jotters are now imprinted with "Made in France". Additionally, some Parker products are produced under license in India for consumption in India and are commonly found for sale on eBay.

In April 2016 Parker significantly updated the line, introducing a new core range and premium range. Both feature metal barrels, in a variety of colours, named after London Underground stations. Both ranges feature a new clip with an updated arrow design, while the premium range complements this with more intricate designs on the cap portion of the pen. In 2017 the company introduced a set of four XL models, each of a 7% larger diameter and length using the standard Parker-style ballpoint refill. For a number of years, Parker has annually marketed a special set of Jotters, usually in different colors from the standard offerings.

== Sales ==
In the Jotter's first year of production, Parker sold more than 3.5 million units. By 1963, nearly 50 million had been sold. And by 2020, over 750 million had been sold.

== Appearances in media ==
The Parker Jotter appeared in numerous films and television programmes.

A specially modified version of the Parker Jotter plays a role in the seventeenth James Bond film GoldenEye. This version of the pen was modified by Q to incorporate an explosive device which is armed and disarmed by clicking the plunger three times. Continuous arming, disarming, and rearming the pen by a character unaware of its explosive nature plays a major role in the film's climax.

== See also ==
- Parker 51
- Parker Jointless
- Parker Vacumatic
- Parker Duofold
- Quink
- Ballpoint pen
- Writing implement
