= Hopalong Cassidy (disambiguation) =

Hopalong Cassidy is a fictional cowboy hero created in 1904 by author Clarence E. Mulford who has appeared in a variety of media.

Hopalong Cassidy may also refer to:

- Hopalong Cassidy, a 1910 novel by Clarence E. Mulford
- Hopalong Cassidy (film series), a 1935-1948 film series starring William Boyd as Hopalong Cassidy
  - Hop-Along Cassidy, the first film in the series
- Hopalong Cassidy (radio program), a radio program that aired from 1948 to 1952 and starred Boyd as Cassidy
- Hopalong Cassidy (TV series), a TV series that aired from 1949 to 1952 and starred Boyd as Cassidy
- Hopalong Cassidy, a 1949–1955 comic strip drawn by Dan Spiegle
- Hopalong Cassidy, a retractable and refillable ballpoint pen made by the Parker Pen Company before its introduction of the Jotter

== See also ==
- Hopalong Cassady or Howard Cassady (1934–2019), an American football player
- Hopalong Cassidy River Trail, a trail in Illinois
- Hopalong Casualty, a 1960 animated short film
