= Quisumbing =

Quisumbing is a surname. Notable people with the surname include:

- Agnes Quisumbing, Filipino economist
- Eduardo Quisumbing (1895–1986), Filipino biologist
- Francisco Quisumbing, Filipino botanist
- Leonardo Quisumbing (1939–2019), Filipino jurist
- Lourdes Quisumbing (1921–2017), Filipino politician
- Luigi Quisumbing (born 1979), Filipino politician
