= Parker Pen Company =

Writing pen manufacturer

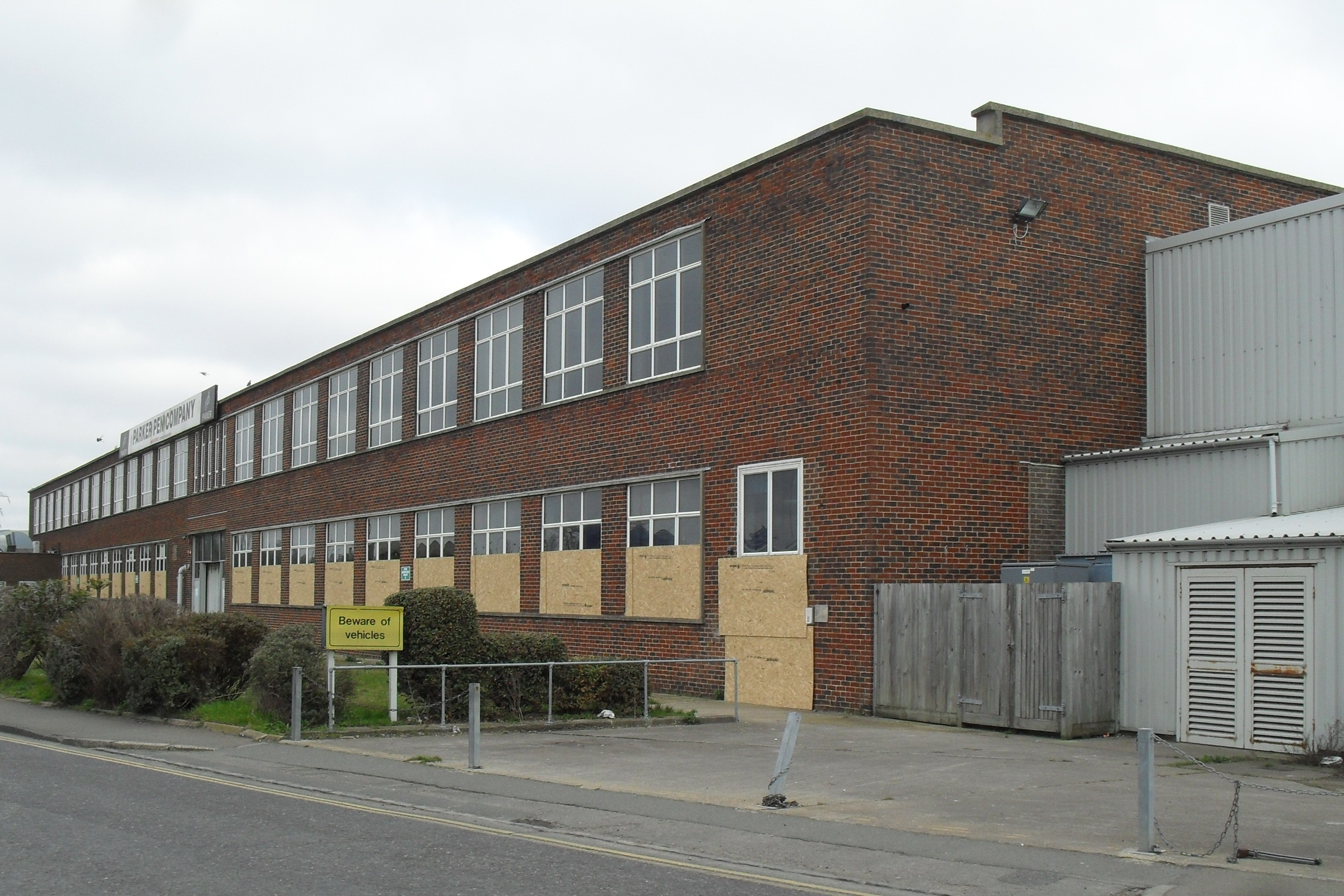
- The Parker factory on Railway Road in Newhaven, England
- Type: Subsidiary
- Industry: Writing instruments
- Founded: 1888; 138 years ago in Janesville, Wisconsin, U.S.
- Founder: George Safford Parker
- Headquarters: Nantes, France
- Area served: Worldwide
- Products: Fountain and ballpoint pens, mechanical pencils
- Parent: Newell Brands
- Website: www.parkerpen.com

The Parker Pen Company is a writing instrument manufacturer founded in 1888 by George Safford Parker in Janesville, Wisconsin. Parker was previously a sales agent for another pen company before creating his own business. The company was one of the top two writing instrument sellers worldwide from the 1920s through the 1960s. Some of its innovations include the "Lucky Curve" fountain pen feed and Quink (quick-drying ink). The Parker Jotter ballpoint has sold more than 750 million units since its introduction in 1954.

Through various ownership changes, Parker was acquired by Gillette in 1993, then by Newell Rubbermaid in 2000. The company faced challenges when generic copies of its products arrived on the market after patents expired. In response, both the original Janesville location and the Newhaven, England factory were closed, with production consolidated in Nantes, France.

Parker Pens were historically favored by U.S. presidents from Kennedy through Clinton for signing legislation. Today, Parker manufactures various pen lines including fountain, ballpoint, and rollerball pens across different product ranges.

== History ==
George Safford Parker, the founder, had previously been a sales agent for the John Holland Gold Pen Company. He received his first fountain pen related patent in 1889. In 1894, Parker received a patent on his "Lucky Curve" fountain pen feed, which was claimed to draw excess ink back into the pen barrel when the pen was not in use. The company's first successful pen, released in 1899, was the Parker Jointless.

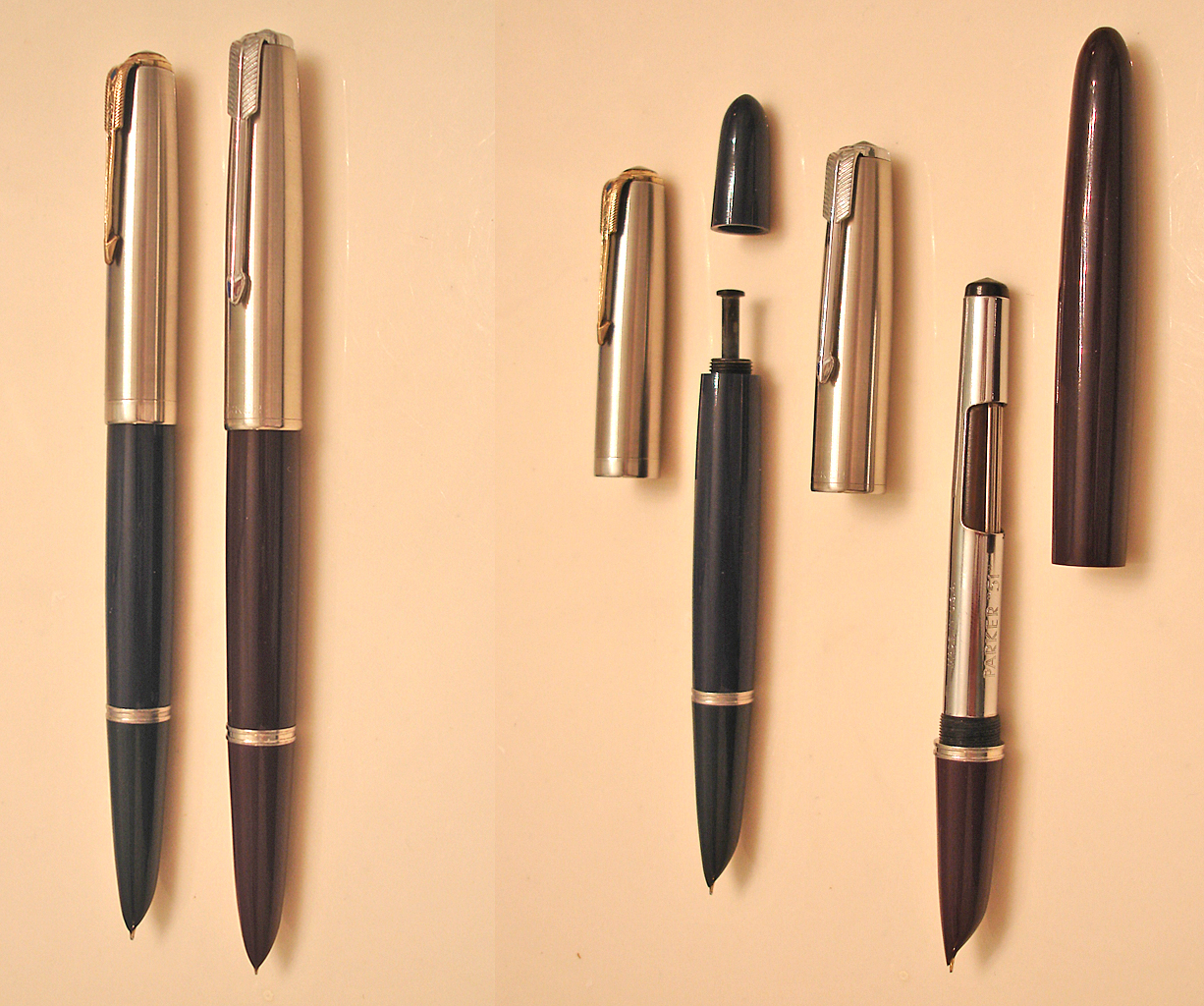
Several models of the Parker 51, regarded as the most widely used model of fountain pen

From the 1920s to the 1960s, before the development of the ballpoint pen, Parker was either number one or number two in worldwide writing instrument sales. In 1931, Parker created Quink (quick drying ink), which eliminated the need for blotting. In 1941, the company developed the most widely used fountain pen model in history, the Parker 51, which led to over $400 million in sales during its 30-year history.

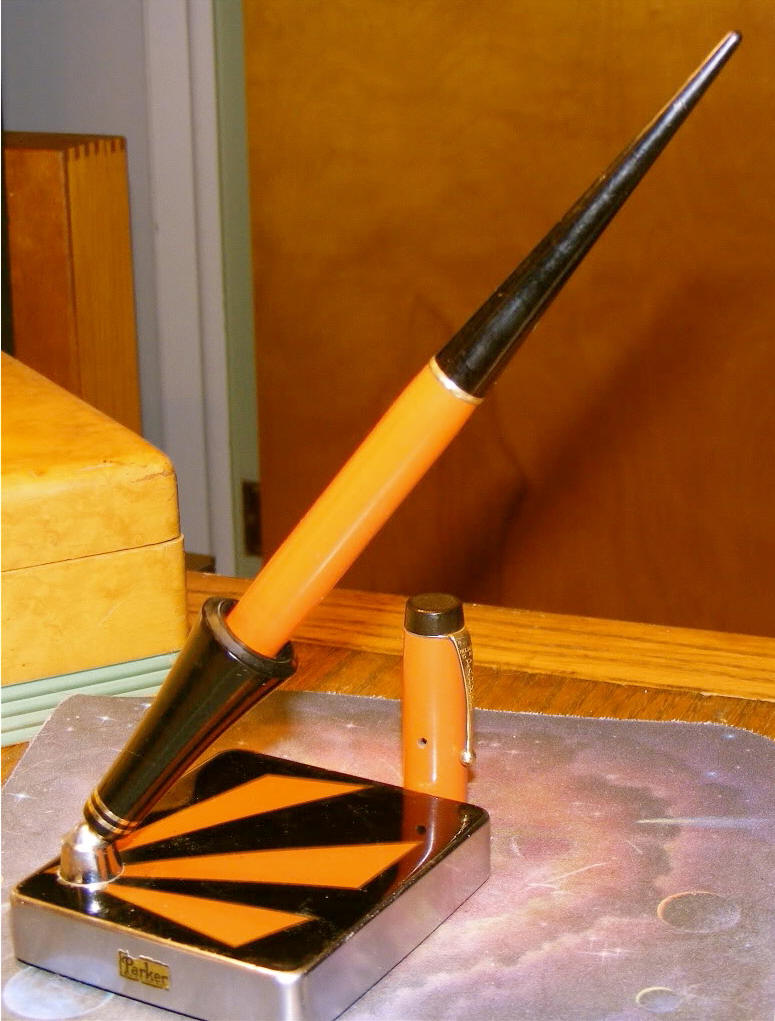
Parker Duofold desk set, 1930

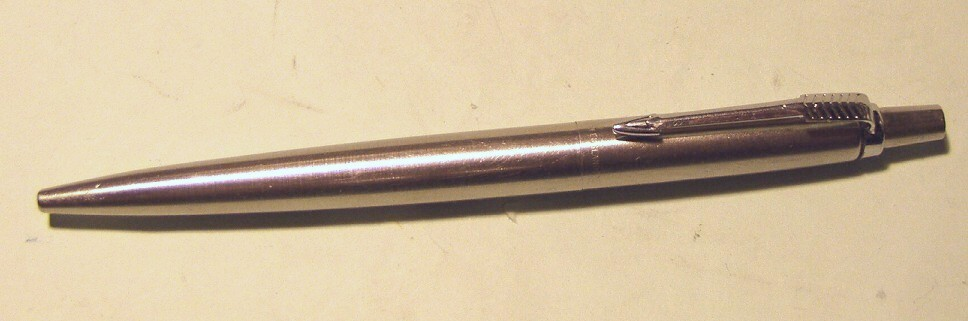
Parker Jotter pen

In 1954, Parker released the Parker Jotter ballpoint pen with its original nylon body and inverted "V" clip. The Jotter would go on to sell over 750 million units during its history. In 1955, the company introduced its Liquid Lead pencil, which used liquid graphite to write like a pen. However, the Scripto company had introduced a similar product called Fluidlead a few months prior.

The company bought retailer and catalog company Norm Thompson in 1973, and then sold it in 1981.

A management buyout in 1986 moved the company's headquarters to Newhaven, East Sussex, England, which was the original location of the Valentine Pen Company previously acquired by Parker. In 1993, Parker was purchased by the Gillette Company, which already owned the Paper Mate brand – the best-selling disposable ballpoint. In 2000, Gillette sold its writing instruments division to the company Newell Rubbermaid, whose Sanford Stationery Division became the largest writing instrument manufacturers in the world at that time, simultaneously owning such brand names as Rotring, Sharpie, Reynolds as well as Parker, PaperMate, Waterman, and Liquid Paper.

After Parker's unique design patent for its Jotter classic metal ink refill cartridge expired, low cost generic copies produced in China led to increased commercial competition. Parker's sales began to see drastic adverse effects as a result. In July 2009, Newell Rubbermaid Inc. in response announced that it had decided to close down the Parker production factory at Newhaven in England, with the dismissal of 180 employees from the facility, and relocate production to France. The following month, Newell Rubbermaid announced that closure of the factory in Janesville, Wisconsin, which eliminated a further 153 manufacturing jobs. The company press release stated: "This decision is a response to structural issues accelerated by market trends and is in no way a reflection on the highly valued work performed by our Janesville employees over the years." Newell Rubbermaid offered 'transitional employment services' along with severance pay in compensation to the dismissed workforce.

With a strategic move from mass-market appeal to luxury retailers, Parker also altered its traditional product warranty on its high end pens, changing the former lifetime guarantee to a two-year warranty limitation.

Parker Pen Co. was an aviation pioneer. The interest of Parker Pen Co. in aircraft came from Kenneth Parker, son of the founder; he enlisted in the fledgling air service and, after flight training at Miami Air Base, USA, he was assigned to officer training in tactical maneuvers at Pensacola Naval Air Station, Florida, USA. From their first company business plane, the Parker Duofold Fairchild, they used it as an innovative advertising weapon inviting his dealers.

== Models ==
Key models in the company's history include:

- Jointless (1899)
- Jack Knife Safety (1909)
- Duofold (1921)
- Vacumatic (1932)
- 51 (1941)
- Jotter (1954)
- 61 (1956)
- 45 (1960)
- 75 (1964)
- Classic (1967)
- 25 (1975)
- 180 (1977)
- Arrow (1982)
- Vector (1986)
- Duofold International (1987)
- 95 (1988)
- Sonnet (1993)
- Parker 100 (2004)

=== Parker Jointless ===
The Parker Jointless "Lucky Curve" is a range of fountain pens released by the Parker Pen Company in late 1897. The pen used the Lucky Curve ink supply system, designed to draw ink even when the pen was not in use, which was invented and patented by George Safford Parker in 1894. The pen was named "Jointless" because of its one-piece ink barrel, designed to prevent leakage. The pen was Parker's first to be advertised outside the United States. The American government purchased the pens in large quantities and a Parker Jointless was one of the pens used to sign the Spanish–American Treaty of Paris in 1898.

In 1894 and following successive improvements to his 1889 patent, George S. Parker perfected the Curve Tubular Overfeed. In 1896 this device would be improved and adapted as underfeed in the #2X Parker models according with Patent No. 606,231, which came to be known as Lucky Curve. This innovative element established a continuous capillary connection between the nib and the inner walls of the barrel avoiding some of the particular problems that, in its time, had the use of fountain pens; difficulty starting the ink flow when starting to write; poor, excessive, or uneven ink flow; ink dripping from the pen when the reservoir was not full or nearly empty, and ink overflowing through the section when the pen was reversed after use.

=== Parker Vacumatic ===
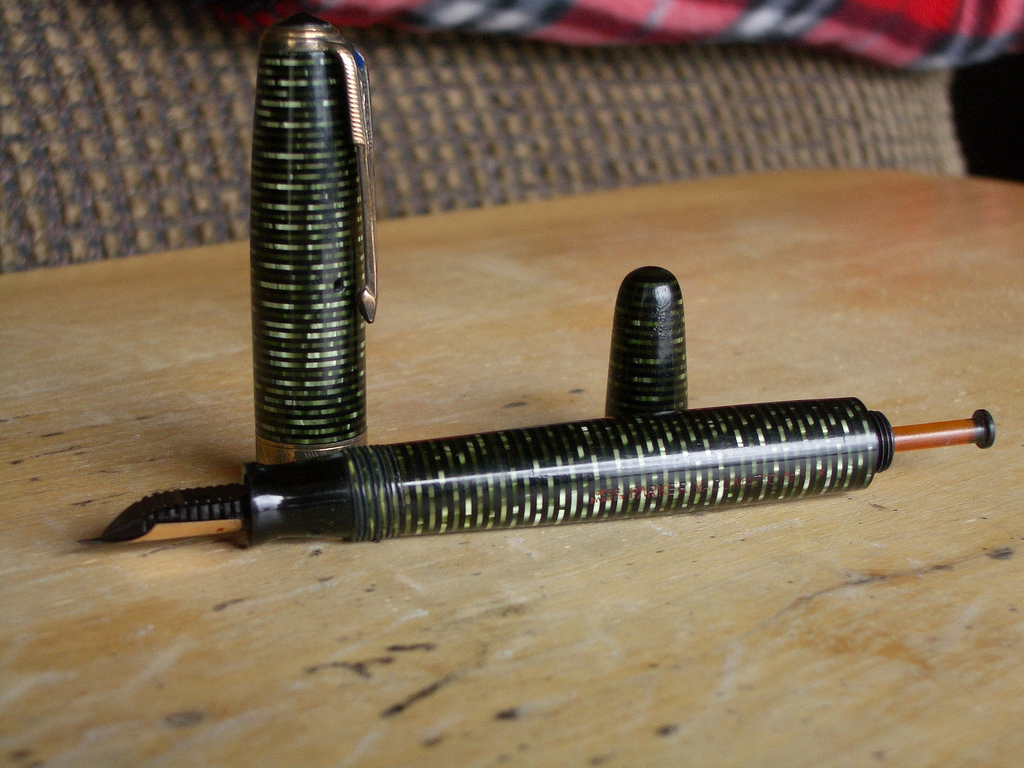
Uncapped Parker Vacumatic

The Parker Vacumatic fountain pen was launched in 1932, and would come to out-sell the Parker Duofold, the then top seller. The pen was originally marketed under the name of Golden Arrow, a reference to the new arrow clip but was again changed to Vacuum Filler in reference to its ink reservoir filling action.

The Vacumatic featured a brand new filling mechanism which took 5 years to develop at a cost of $125,000. Parker boasted the model to be the first self-filler without a sac; while this was not entirely true, the filling mechanism was still a great innovation. By using a diaphragm rather than a sac, the whole barrel can be used as a reservoir. The principal workings are essentially like that of the earlier button fillers like the Duofold as the depression of the plunger pushed on the rubber sac and forced out the air (creating a vacuum) and when the rubber regained its natural form the ink got sucked into the pen to replace the air. The difference was that the previous button was replaced with a fat (approximately 4 mm) plunger that was used to operate the diaphragm. The plunger could be locked in a down position with a twist of the thumb and is referred to as the Lock-Down Fill, or Twist-Fill.

Although the pen came in many sizes and colors, the most widely recognizable Vacumatics featured alternating horizontal bands of pearlescent and clear celluloid. The Duofold was reintroduced in 1940 as one of the Vacumatic series. Often referred to by collectors as "Duovacs," this series featured vertical or "striped" alternating pearlescent and clear striations. The clear bands on Vacumatics allowed the user to see the level of ink in the barrel, and garnered much eye appeal with Parker's different color offerings. Several generations of Vacumatic were produced.

Vacumatics remained Parker's top-of-the-line product until the launch of the 51 in 1941. The Parker Vacumatic was phased out in 1948 but remained in production in Canada until 1953.

=== Parker 51 ===
The Parker 51 is a fountain pen first introduced in 1941. Parker marketed it as "The World’s Most Wanted Pen", a slogan alluding to restrictions on production of consumer goods for civilian markets in the United States during World War II. Parker's continual advertising during the war created demand that took several years to fulfil after the end of the conflict.

The pen and the ink were both named "51" to mark 1939, the company's 51st anniversary, during which development for the pen was completed (U.S. design patent No. 116,097, U.S. patent 2,223,541 filed). By giving the pen a number instead of a name, Parker avoided the problem of translating a name into other languages.

=== Parker Jotter ===
The Parker Jotter is a retractable ballpoint pen manufactured by Parker Pen Company. The first was the Hopalong Cassidy Parkette ballpoint made for children. Since 1954, over 750 million have been sold worldwide. It is priced between $6 for lower end models, and $20 for higher end models, such as special editions. Its refill has a ballpoint tip originally called the T-Ball (for tungsten), with a unique textured surface that greatly reduces slipping and failure to transfer ink onto slick paper, known as "skipping". The technology is now commonly used in the pen industry. The pens are also a popular advertising medium. The external design of the Parker T-Ball refill is a configuration copied by many other brands of refillable pens.

=== Parker 25 ===
The Parker 25 was a pen introduced by the Parker Pen Company in 1975. Created by the designer Kenneth Grange based on a detailed brief, it was manufactured in Newhaven, England and produced in a variety of different versions until 1999. An eye-catching, contemporary-looking pen, with mainly steel components, the Parker 25 was intended to revive the company's fortunes. As The Guardian wrote, '(Grange's) classic Parker pen had the machined lustre of a bullet. In fact, its tapering barrel was inspired by an American space rocket, a form that enabled the lid to be the same diameter as the pen no matter which end it was attached to.' It was affordable enough to become a staple entry-level pen for both work and leisure uses – and for secondary school students at a time when fountain pens were still obligatory in many British schools. Advertising slogans used to market Parker 25s included 'Modern as Tomorrow', 'Space Age Design, Space Age Performance', 'European Styled' and 'Contemporary, Highly Functional Design'.

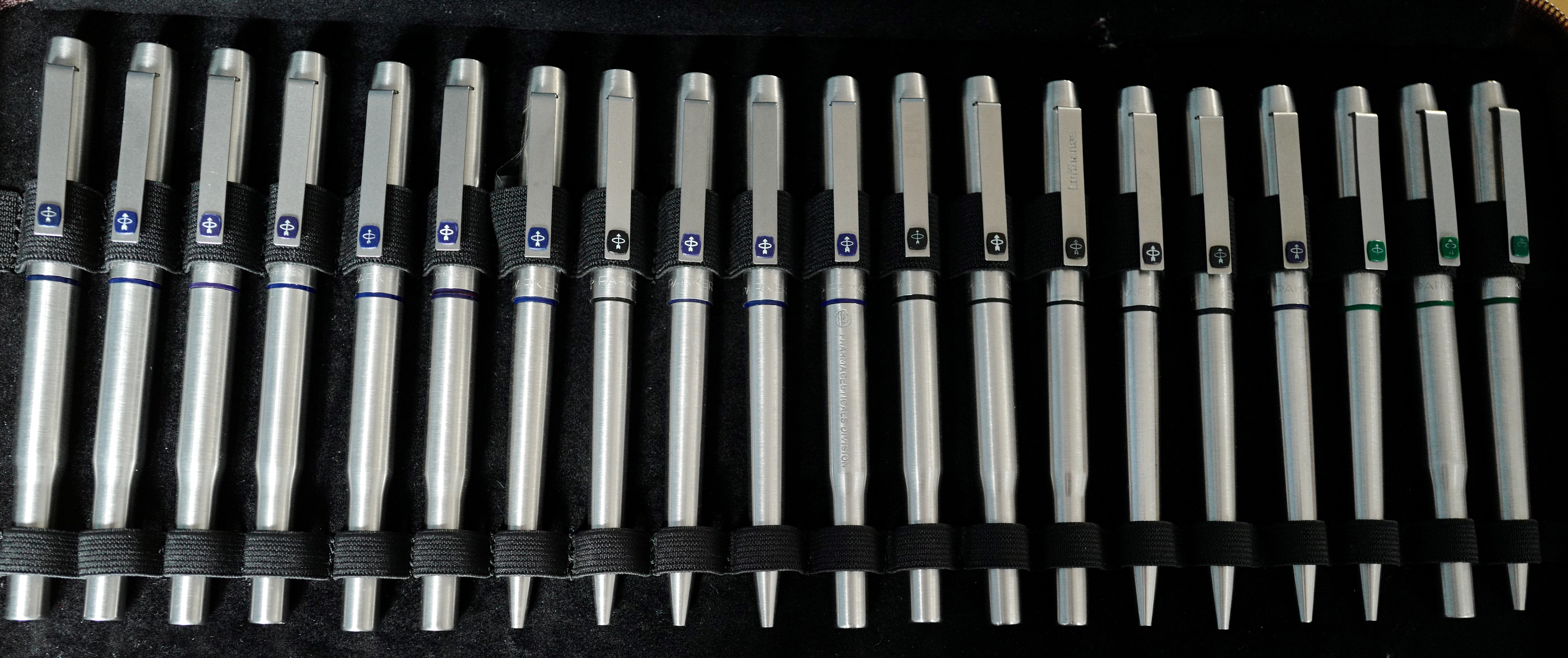
Parker 25 flighters

Parker 25s were issued in several variants: initially, fountain pen, ballpoint, fiber point and mechanical pencil. A rollerball model was introduced in 1981, and fiber tips were phased out a couple of years later. While the great majority of Parker 25s were 'flighters', with a brushed steel finish, matte black and later white versions were issued between 1978 and 1987. The pens had four different trim colors: blue (the most common), black, green, and most rarely of all, orange. Orange trim Parker 25s were discontinued in 1976 following a copyright dispute with Rotring, and surviving examples are very sought after. A striking feature of all Parker 25s is the square plastic tassie logo on the clip.

The earliest Mark I Parker 25 fountain pens dating from the first year of production feature a distinctive breather hole in the nib. While the original models had a flat plastic circle on top of the cap, Mark III and IV pens have a round ridge on this inner cap. Pens manufactured from 1980 feature letter date codes which were changed every quarter. Those manufactured from 1990 are stamped 'Made in UK'; earlier pens were inscribed 'Made in England'. Pens without any manufacture stamps, or inscribed 'Made in Aust', are very rare. Parker 25s were all assembled in Britain by hand – unlike Jotters, Vectors and other mass market pens – and were very minimalist, comprising between 9 and 11 components.

The 25 was an extremely successful pen for Parker commercially, especially during its first decade or so of production. A number of promotional versions were made up to order, featuring company logos on the barrel (the matte black and white versions were often branded in this way), clip or cap.

Some pen fans are rather disparaging about the Parker 25, which lacks the status of the Parker Duofold or the storied Parker 51. But in recent years they have been enjoying a revival, their space age look evoking nostalgia for the final quarter of the twentieth century. The Parker 25 was even given the accolade of an exhibition stand at the Victoria and Albert Museum.

=== Parker 180 ===
The Parker 180 was developed in the 1970s. Introduced to market in 1977 as an attempt to modernize the then-floundering fountain pen industry, the 180 was a slender pen with a very unusual flat nib design.

Like many Parker fountain pens, the 180 had a flexible ink sac reservoir. To load the pen with ink, one would remove the outer casing of the pen body, lower the nib into a bottle of ink, and squeeze-and-release the ink sac, drawing ink into the pen as the springy rubber sac returned to its rest shape.

=== Parker Vector ===
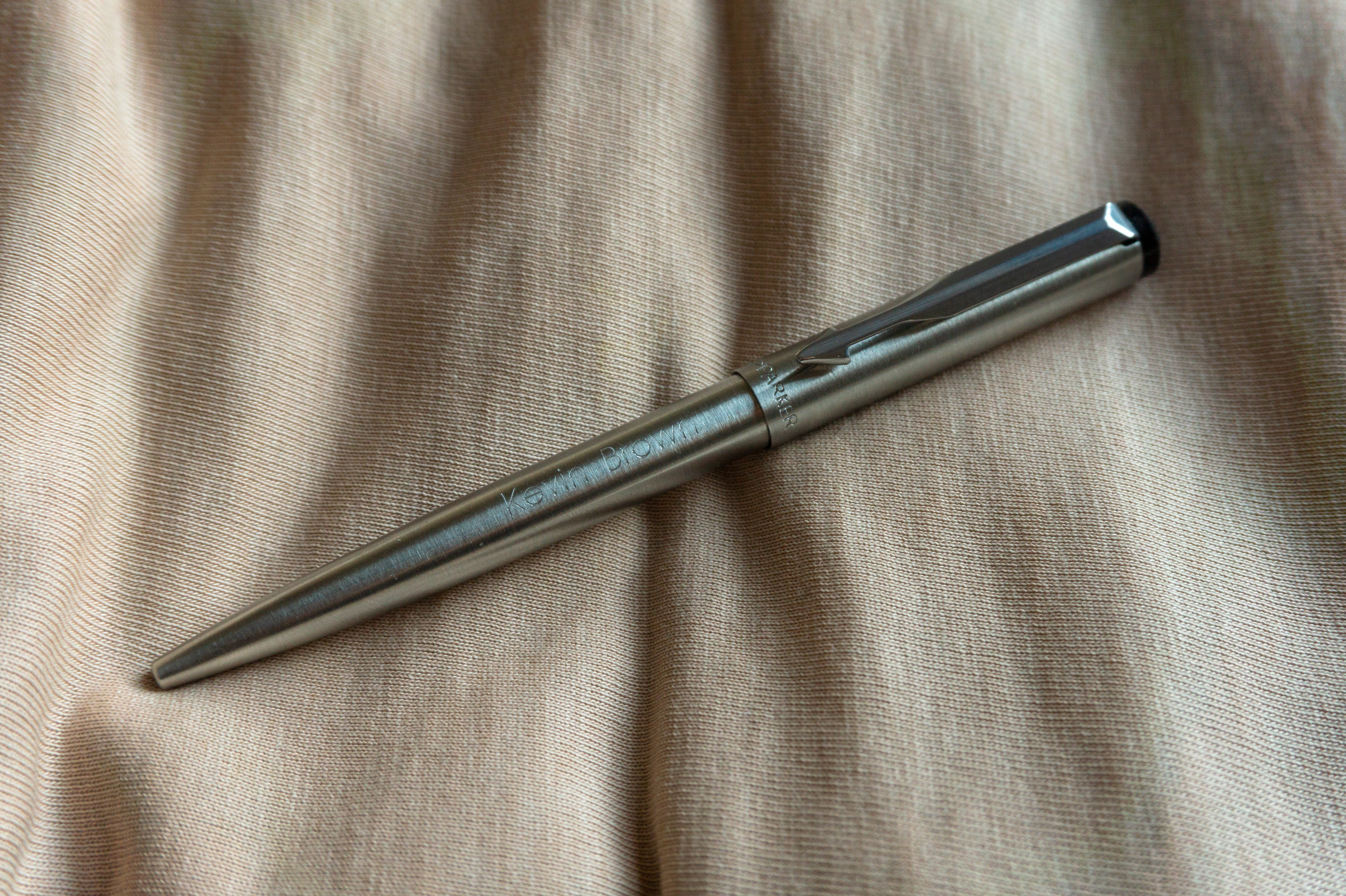
Parker Vector stainless steel ballpoint pen

The precursor to the Parker Vector was introduced in 1981. It was a simple cylindrical plastic cap and barrel roller-ball pen called the "Parker RB1". In 1984, Parker added the FP1 ("Fountain Pen 1"), with essentially the same design. The RB1 and FP1 models were produced until 1986, at which time Parker revised the pen by lengthening the cap and shortening the barrel and renaming the new pen the "Vector Standard". Presently, there are four models available (in plastic and steel): the fountain pen, capped rollerball, pushbutton ballpoint, and pushbutton pencil.

== U.S. Presidential Parkers ==
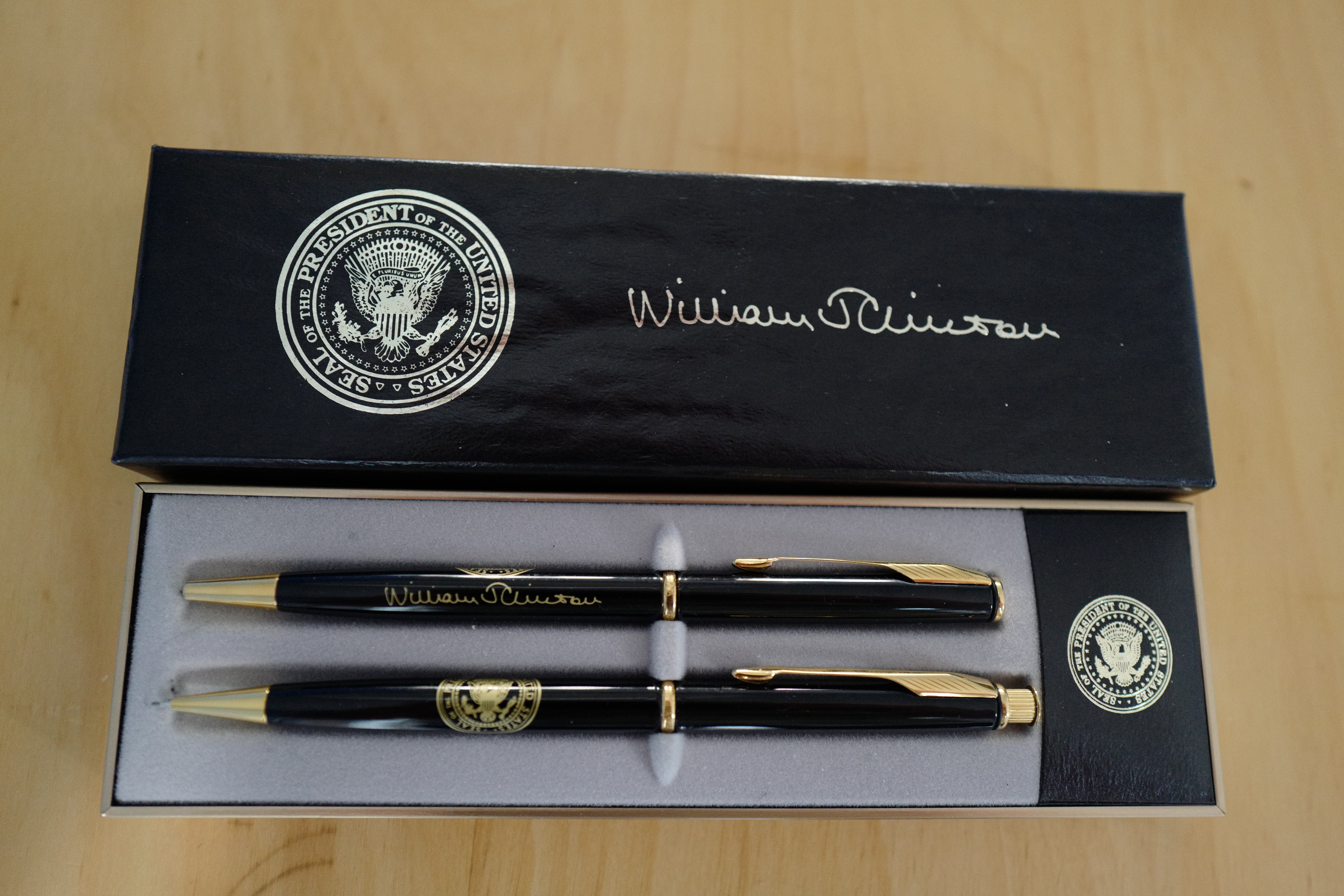
Bill Clinton Parker Insignia Set

Parker Jotters were a favorite choice of President John F. Kennedy for signing legislation and to give as gifts. Successive presidents from Kennedy to Clinton used Parker pens for these purposes, and Parker retained a special representative, John W. Gibbs, to handle White House orders. In one of his early years in office, Lyndon Johnson ordered no less than 60,000 Parker pens. LBJ would use up to 75 pens to sign each important document and bill, writing different strokes of the letters of his name with different pens, and giving them all away to allies and supporters with little typed certificates. After Parker ceased to be an American-owned company, later presidents switched to using A. T. Cross Company pens, although President Bill Clinton continued to use the Parker Insignia.

== Products ==
Products offered by the Parker Pen Company as of 2012:

Type	Model
5th Technology	I.M., Ingenuity, Sonnet, Urban
Fountain pens	Duofold, Premier, Frontier, Sonnet, Facet, Esprit, Urban, I.M., Vector, Jotter
Ballpoint pens	Reflex, Facet, Executive, Esprit, Frontier, Urban, I.M., Vector, Jotter, Classic
Inks and refills	Quink, 5TH Mode

== See also ==
- List of pen types, brands and companies
