= Quink =

Parker fountain pen ink

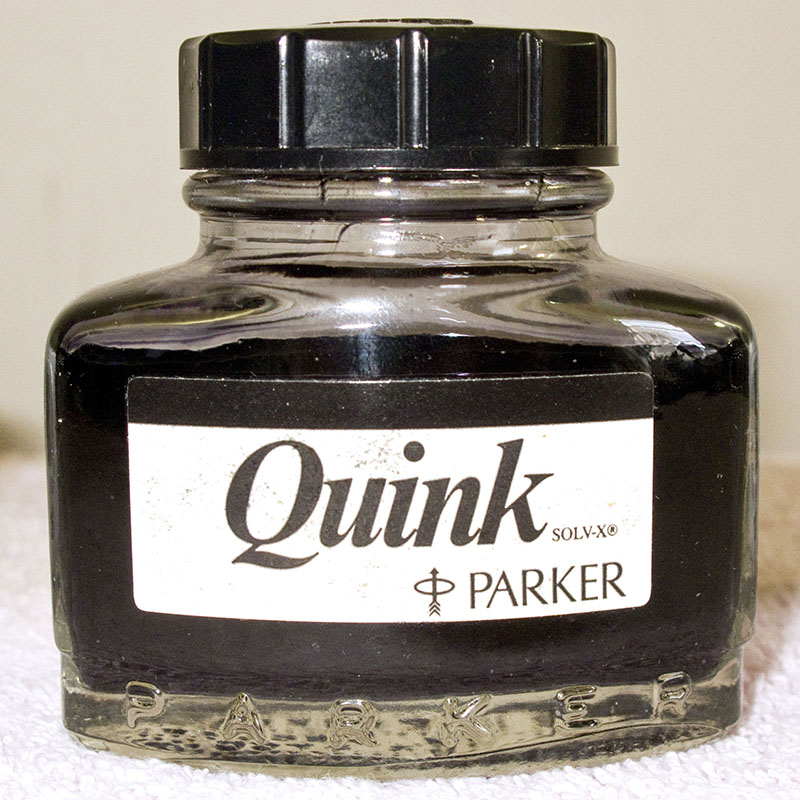
Parker Quink bottle with SOLV-X notation

Quink (a portmanteau from 'quick' and 'ink') is a fountain pen ink developed by the Parker Pen Company. It was introduced in 1931 and has remained in production ever since.

== Background ==
In 1928, under the direction of Kenneth Parker, the Parker Pen Company set out to develop a new and improved fountain pen ink. Inferior inks had long been the main cause of clogged fountain pens, yet popular ink formulations had remained unchanged in decades. Research for the project was initially outsourced to Miner Laboratories of Chicago. In August 1930 one of the lead chemists, Galen Sayler, was hired directly and put to work in a small laboratory at company headquarters in Janesville, Wisconsin.

== History ==
Quink was heavily advertised, and an immediate success. According to Kenneth Parker's personal journal, Quink production began on March 17, 1931, and $89,000 worth had been shipped by October 22—more than twice the company's expectations and an excellent return on the $68,000 spent on its development. Quink was introduced as a general-purpose ink, safe for use in all fountain pens. It remains in production, with minor changes in formulation.

=== Francisco Quisumbing ===
A popular misconception is that the ink was invented by a Filipino, Francisco Quisumbing, and takes its name from 'Quisumbing Ink'. Although this apocryphal tale appears on numerous websites, no reliable source is ever cited. The accounts uniformly identify the supposed inventor as Francisco Quisumbing, a Filipino botanist who studied in both the Philippines and the US, gaining a PhD in Plant Taxonomy, Systematics and Morphology from the University of Chicago in 1923. What biographical information that can be found is incomplete and unreliable. There is no indication that such a person ever worked for Parker.

There was a company called Quisumbing Ink Products in the Philippines, unconnected to Parker, founded by a chemical engineer named Francisco A. Quisumbing. The milestones of Quisumbing's documented career are close enough to those recounted in the apocryphal accounts that it is probable that they refer, with differing degrees of accuracy, to the same man. The real Francisco A. Quisumbing was born in 1893 and received his B. Agr. in 1914 and his M. S. in 1918, both from the University of the Philippines. He was a Fellow of the University of the Philippines at Columbia University in New York from 1918 to 1921, receiving his Ph.D. from Columbia in 1921. He returned to the Philippines to teach as Professor of Industrial Chemistry at the University of the Philippines from 1922 to 1934. In 1923, he started the Quisumbing Ink Products company, and in 1934, founded the Quisumbing School of Technology. According to a book published in 1960, Quisumbing inks then enjoyed an exclusive contract to supply all branches of the Philippine government.

Quink was later manufactured in the Philippines under license from Parker, and the bottles were labelled accordingly.

== Features ==
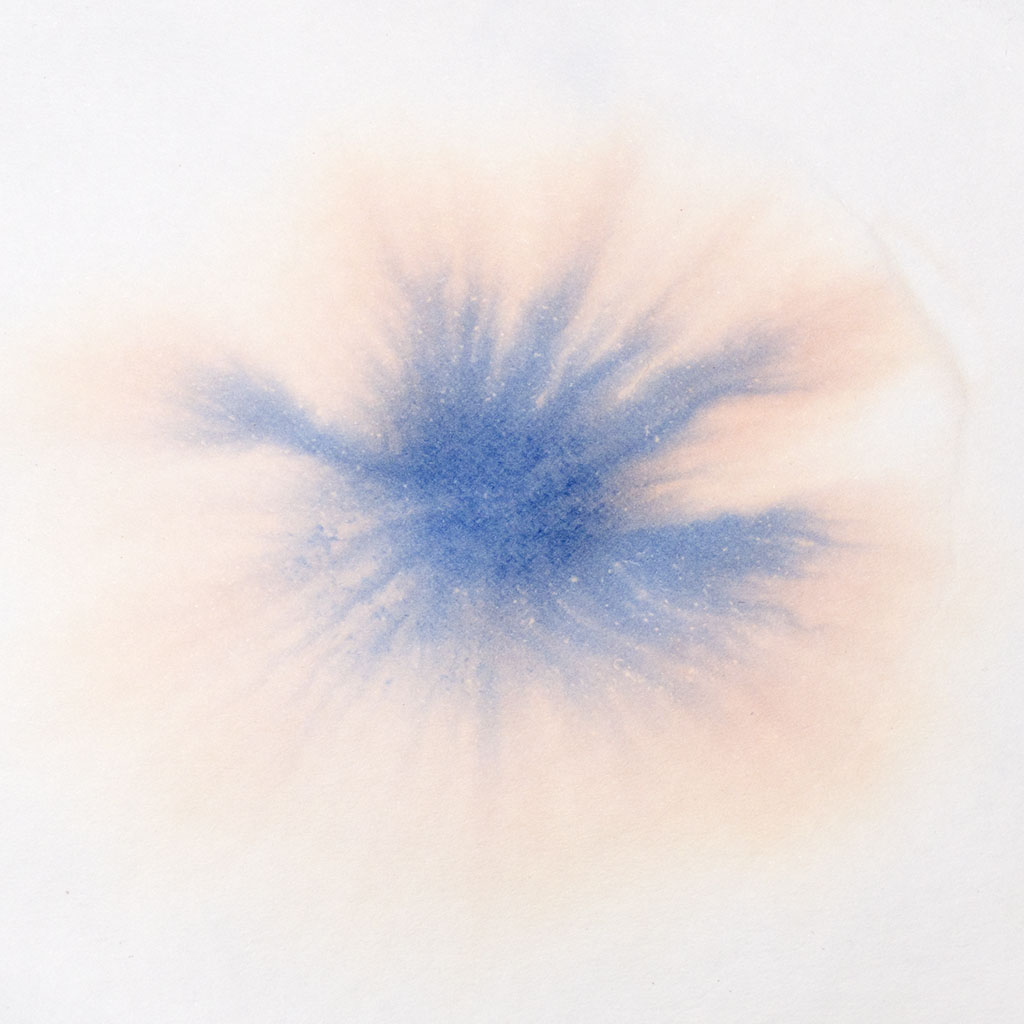
Quink Blot on damp paper

The success of Quink lay in its useful features: it had the desired quality of ink flow, it resisted water and molding, it was non-corrosive, and it was claimed to be quick-drying. From the beginning it was advertised as containing a "secret" additive which purportedly dissolved sediment and reduced clogging. In 1942 this additive was given the trademarked name "Solv-X".

Quink was developed and introduced when the Duofold was Parker's flagship line, but the Duofold's successor, the Vacumatic was already under development and was in full production by 1933. Vacumatics held their ink supply directly within their celluloid barrels, so Quink was formulated accordingly.

Quink is not to be confused with two iterations of a special ink formulated exclusively for use in the Parker 51. This ink was highly alkaline and while water-based, also included a substantial amount of isopropyl alcohol. It was released in 1941 as "51" ink, along with the Parker 51 pen; in 1947 it was made somewhat less corrosive, and renamed "Superchrome". Parker was careful to print prominent warnings on caps, labels, and boxes that the ink could only be used in the 51 (and, later, its economy version, the 21), and would damage any other pen.

Prior to the full public introduction of the Parker 51 in 1941, selected market testing of the new pen was carried out, starting in 1939. Since the 51 and its special ink had been designed together as a complete system, the new ink was given limited release in tandem with the market tests under the name "Double Quink". By all evidence, Double Quink was not advertised to the general public, and the name was dropped once the 51 went on general sale. Actual surviving examples of Double Quink bottles would appear to be vanishingly rare: not a single photo appears in the Shepherds' authoritative and officially-sponsored Parker 51 monograph, despite the researchers' access to Parker's own archives as well as collections worldwide.

== Twenty-first century ==
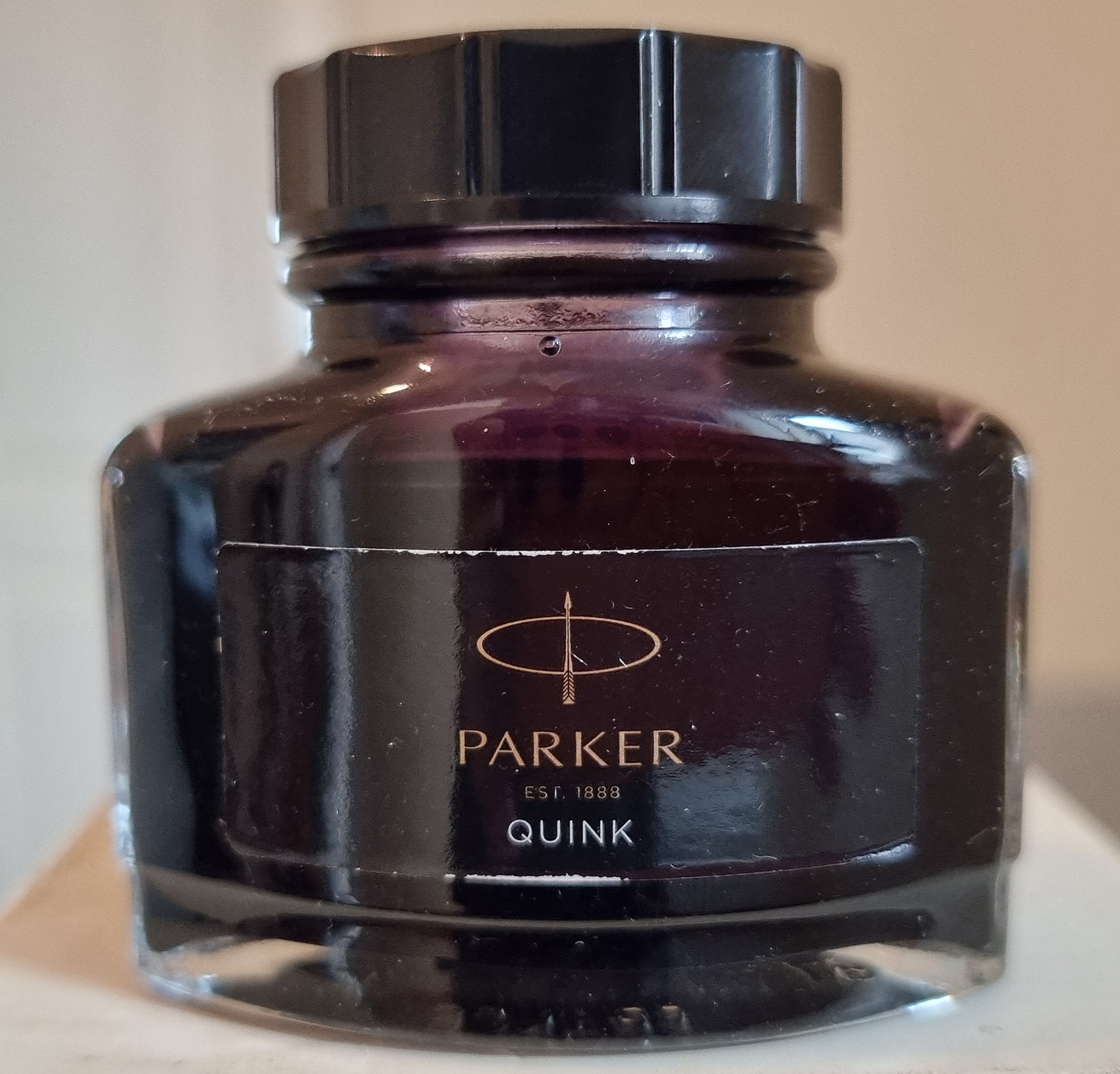
2026 Quink Bottle

Quink cartridges in a blister pack

According to fountain pen enthusiasts, Parker Quink is generally considered to be "safe fountain pen ink"; this means that it should not stain or clog fountain pens very easily.

The use of fountain pens gradually decreased during the second half of the 20th century. Many collectors and enthusiasts continue to use the Parker 51 pen in the 21st century, with a limited edition of the model (available in two colors, "Vista Blue" and black) released by Parker in 2002. As part of the 2002 product revival, Parker promoted its quick-drying ink as the ideal accompaniment for the Parker 51.

== Sources ==
- Martín-Gil J, Ramos-Sánchez MC, Martín-Gil FJ and José-Yacamán M. Chemical composition of a fountain pen ink. Journal of Chemical Education, 2006, 83, 1476–78
