= George Safford Parker =

American inventor of leak-resistant fountain pen (1863-1937)

- Born: November 1, 1863; Shullsburg, Wisconsin
- Died: July 19, 1937 (aged 73); Chicago, Illinois
- Education: Upper Iowa University
- Engineering career
- Institutions: Parker Pen Company
- Significant advance: Fountain pen

George Safford Parker (November 1, 1863, Shullsburg – July 19, 1937, Chicago) was an American inventor and industrialist.

== Biography ==
=== Early life ===
Parker was born in Shullsburg, Wisconsin in November 1863, and graduated from Upper Iowa University in Fayette, Iowa.

He worked as a telegraphy instructor in Janesville, Wisconsin, and had a sideline repairing and selling fountain pens. Dismayed by the unreliability of the pens, he experimented with ways to prevent ink leaks.

=== Career as Inventor and Industrialist ===
In 1888, he founded the Parker Pen Company, and the next year he received his first fountain pen patent. By 1908, his factory on Main Street in Janesville was reportedly the largest pen manufacturing facility in the world. Parker eventually became one of the world's premier pen brands, and one of the first brands with a global presence.

=== Legacy ===
George S. Parker High School in Janesville is his namesake.
