= Parker Vacumatic =

Fountain pen made by Parker Pen Company

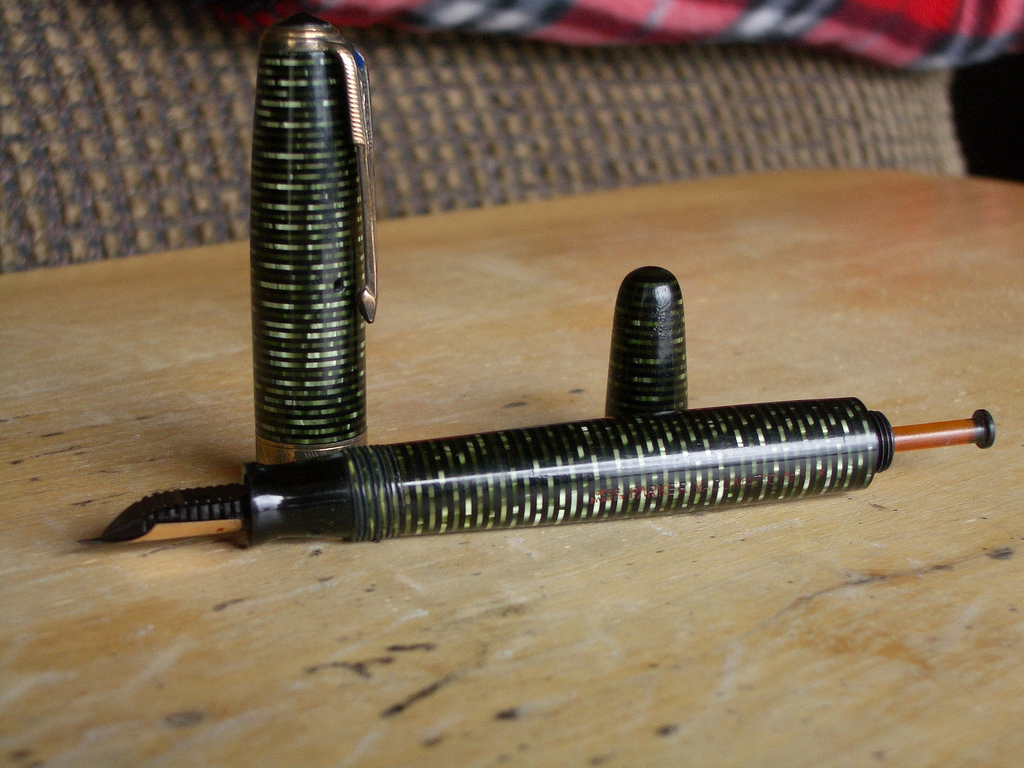
Uncapped Parker Vacumatic

The Parker Vacumatic fountain pen was launched in 1932, and would come to out-sell the Parker Duofold, the then top seller. The pen was originally marketed under the name of Golden Arrow, a reference to the new arrow clip but was again changed to Vacuum Filler in reference to its ink reservoir filling action.

The Vacumatic featured a brand new filling mechanism which took 5 years to develop at a cost of $125,000. Parker boasted the model to be the first self-filler without a sac; while this was not entirely true, the filling mechanism was still a great innovation. By using a diaphragm rather than a sac, the whole barrel can be used as a reservoir. The principal workings are essentially like that of the earlier button fillers like the Duofold as the depression of the plunger pushed on the rubber sac and forced out the air (creating a vacuum) and when the rubber regained its natural form the ink got sucked into the pen to replace the air. The difference was that the previous button was replaced with a fat (approximately 4 mm) plunger that was used to operate the diaphragm. The plunger could be locked in a down position with a twist of the thumb and is referred to as the Lock-Down Fill, or Twist-Fill.

Although the pen came in many sizes and colors, the most widely recognizable Vacumatics featured alternating horizontal bands of pearlescent and clear celluloid. The Duofold was reintroduced in 1940 as one of the Vacumatic series. Often referred to by collectors as "Duovacs," this series featured vertical or "striped" alternating pearlescent and clear striations. The clear bands on Vacumatics allowed the user to see the level of ink in the barrel, and garnered much eye appeal with Parker's different color offerings. Several generations of Vacumatic were produced.

Vacumatics remained Parker's top-of-the-line product until the launch of the 51 in 1941. The Parker Vacumatic was phased out in 1948 but remained in production in Canada until 1953.
