= Retractable pen =

Type of ink pen

A pen being clicked

A retractable pen is a type of ballpoint pen that has a spring-loaded ink cartridge which retracts and extends outside a protective housing. By clicking downward on the top of the pen, the tip is extended and locks in place at the bottom of the housing for use.

== History ==
The retractable pen was first invented and patented in 1888 by John J. Loud. However, the design was seen as imperfect and the retractable pen would not be marketed until sixty years later. Lazlo Biro and his brother Gyorgy Biro solved the technical problems of the first ball point by using thicker ink and an easier way to store it. This resulted in the use of capillary action which slowly pulled the ink out of the pen and onto the paper. The brothers sold their pen only in Europe. Milton Reynolds, an American entrepreneur, changed the design to a gravity feed and it became successful in the US market. The Frawley Pen Company, founded in 1949 by Patrick J. Frawley, claims to have made the "first pen with a retractable ballpoint tip" in 1950.

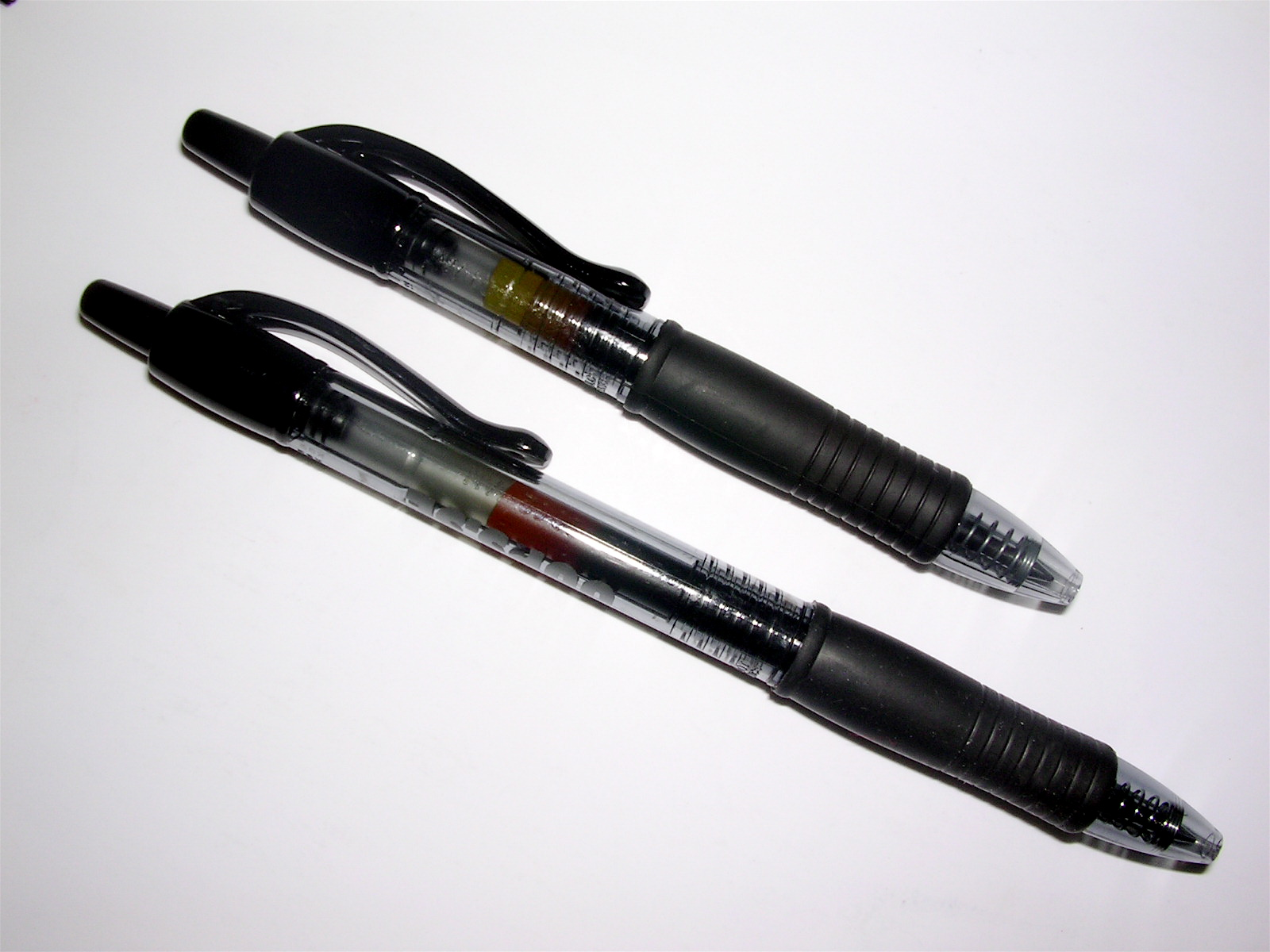
Retractable Pilot Pens

== Mechanism ==
A click pen comprises the frame, a thruster, two cams, a guide pin, a spring, an ink cartridge, a ballpoint at the end of the cartridge, and other parts. The guide pin is typically molded into the frame and the spring provides the tension required to retract the ink cartridge. The cams provide a bistable system where in one position the ink cartridge is retracted and in the other it is extended. When the button at the end of the pen is pressed, the system moves from one position to the other. This causes the ballpoint tip to be pushed forward.

== Habitual pen-clicking ==
Pen clicking is repeated pressing of the button which produces a clicking sound. Normally, the button is only pressed to expose the nib of the pen for writing. The resultant noise varies in tone, dynamic and timbre depending on the size and make of the pen. When the noise is heard repeatedly, it can have a psychological effect on the doer or anyone in earshot. The action can be either conscious or subconscious and is often associated with boredom, inattentiveness, thinking, hiding something, or nervousness. It has been described as a nervous habit – a form of fidgeting. It can also be described as a "distracting activity that releases nervous energy". Clicking a pen can be a type of stimming behavior, but is unique in that "a person can do in public without drawing much attention to themselves," whereas some other similar behaviors are not socially acceptable.

Some people find it hard to concentrate when others are pen-clicking, and so the action may be considered a pet peeve. Pen clicking can also be a trigger of misophonia.

== In popular culture ==
- Boris Grishenko (portrayed by Alan Cumming), a henchman from the 1995 James Bond film GoldenEye, is notable for using pen clicking as his signature character quirk. In the film's climax, Bond exploits this habit by switching Boris' pen with a click-activated Parker Jotter pen grenade, which leads to the destruction of the villain's base.
- In an ad for Kohl's clothing lines, Jennifer Lopez—who plays a fictionalised version of herself—annoys her colleagues by pen-clicking.
