= Hopalong Cassidy River Trail =

- Length: 0.5 mi (0.80 km)
- Location: Streator, Illinois
- Trailheads: 41°7′7.72″N 88°50′25.08″W
- Difficulty: Easy
- Sights: Vermilion River (Illinois River tributary), Clarence E. Mulfords home

The Hopalong Cassidy River Trail is a 0.5 mi; (0.8 km) flat trail on the bank of the Vermilion River in Streator, Illinois. The trail is mostly gravel, with a section of cement next to the Bridge St. Bridge on the north and south side of the road. The trail is part of the local flood control system. It is named after the Hopalong Cassidy western series of books written by author Clarence E. Mulford, whose childhood house sits next to the trail on the south side of the road. The trail is lined with a forest of mulberry, oak and maple trees.
