= Radite =

Radite is a trade name for an early plastic, formed of pyroxylin—a partially nitrated cellulose— manufactured by DuPont and introduced by the Sheaffer Pen Company in 1924 when plastics were first used as a material for pen manufacture.

Sheaffer's Radite pens were the first commercial plastic pens, and Sheaffer marketed the material as "indestructible." Jade green in color, the pens were best sellers at the time. The material is credited with helping Sheaffer capture 25% of the market.

Radite is extremely similar to other celluloid pen materials trademarked at the time, such as Permanite, Pyralin, Fiberloid, Viscoloid, and Herculoid.
