= Francisco Quisumbing =

Filipino botanist

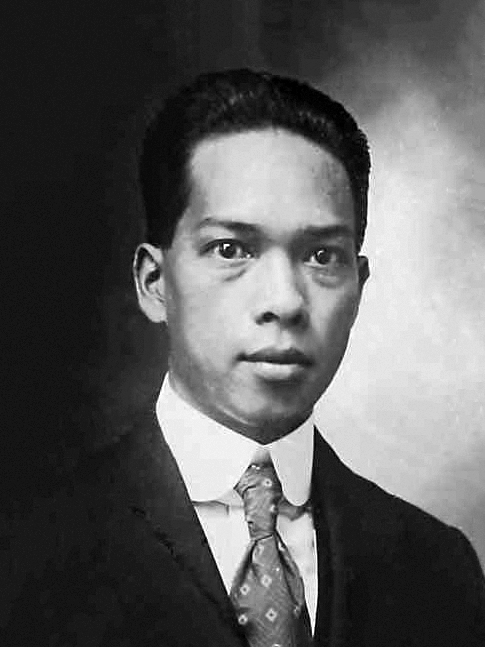
Francisco Quisumbing

Francisco Arguelles Quisumbing is said to be a Filipino botanist claimed to be the inventor of Quink ink used by The Parker Pen Company. While an urban legend claims that Parker Quink stands for 'Quisumbing Ink' after the Filipino botanist, official corporate records confirm the name is simply a portmanteau of 'quick' and 'ink'. He studied in the Philippines and the US, gaining a BSc from the University of the Philippines School of Agriculture, Los Baños in 1918 and an MSc in 1921. He travelled to the US and gained a PhD in Plant Taxonomy, Systematics and Morphology from the University of Chicago in 1923, under the American pensionado program. He went back to the Philippines after World War II but was unable to organize the Philippine Ink Corporation under the Japanese Reparations Program because of too much government intervention.

Quink, which was sold in the US from 1931, is claimed to stand for 'Quisumbing Ink', but there is no reliable evidence to support this. Parker state instead that the name is an amalgam of "quick and ink". However Parker did license the manufacture of Quink in the Philippines, for that market, and the bottles were labelled as such. This, together with the name coincidence, may have been the source of the rumour.

In reality there was a company called Quisumbing Ink Products in the Philippines, unconnected to Parker, founded by a chemical engineer named Francisco A. Quisumbing. The milestones of Quisumbing's documented career are close enough to those recounted in the apocryphal accounts that it is probable that they refer, with differing degrees of accuracy, to the same man. The real Francisco A. Quisumbing was born in 1893 and received his B. Agr. in 1914 and his M. S. in 1918, both from the University of the Philippines. He was a Fellow of the University of the Philippines at Columbia University in New York from 1918 to 1921, receiving his Ph.D. from Columbia in 1921. He returned to the Philippines to teach as Professor of Industrial Chemistry at the University of the Philippines from 1922 to 1934. In 1923, he started the Quisumbing Ink Products company, and in 1934, founded the Quisumbing School of Technology. According to a book published in 1960, Quisumbing inks then enjoyed an exclusive contract to supply all branches of the Philippine government.
