= Parker Duofold =

Fountain pen produced by Parker Pen Company

The Parker Duofold is a range of fountain pens produced by the Parker Pen Company.

Parker Duofold Legacy of Flight pen at Makoba pen store, Bengaluru (2026)

== History ==
The first model was produced in 1921 and was a large pen – 5.5 inches long when capped. It was made of a showy bright red hard rubber and expensively priced at $7.00, equivalent to $126 in 2025.

The original full-sized Duofold was soon joined by the smaller Duofold Junior, Duofold Special, and Lady Duofold. While the Junior and Special could also be fitted with Parker’s Washer Clip, the Lady Duofold was available with a Chatelaine, or Ring Top for hanging around one's neck. The Ring Top would also appear on Parker's Vest Pocket models, for being attached to a watch fob. Matching pencils would come with either clip or ring, depending on the pen selected. The pen was available only in black and red hard rubber until 1926, when Parker introduced the “unbreakable Permanite” Duofold (Permanite was Parker’s trade name for a plastic manufactured by DuPont). The first new hue was the now traditional red, followed by Jade green (made to compete with Sheaffer's revolutionary Jade Radite Lifetime pens) which was not originally referred to as a Duofold, but rather the Black Tipped Jade (changed shortly thereafter). This was followed by Lapis Lazuli blue and Mandarin Yellow. In 1928, Moderne black and pearl (black lined pearl) was introduced as a Deluxe model and Parker signified this by the addition of a third cap ring to the cap band instead of the usual two found at the time. In 1930 the Duofold line was streamlined with tapered ends replacing the familiar “flat-top” style. Additional varieties were introduced: burgundy (red and black pearl); Moderne green and pearl (green lined pearl); and finally, green and black pearl (black lined green pearl).

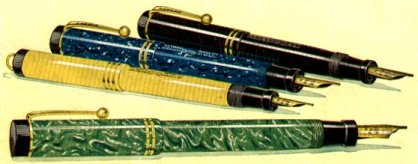
Parker Duofold pens from a 1920s magazine advertisement

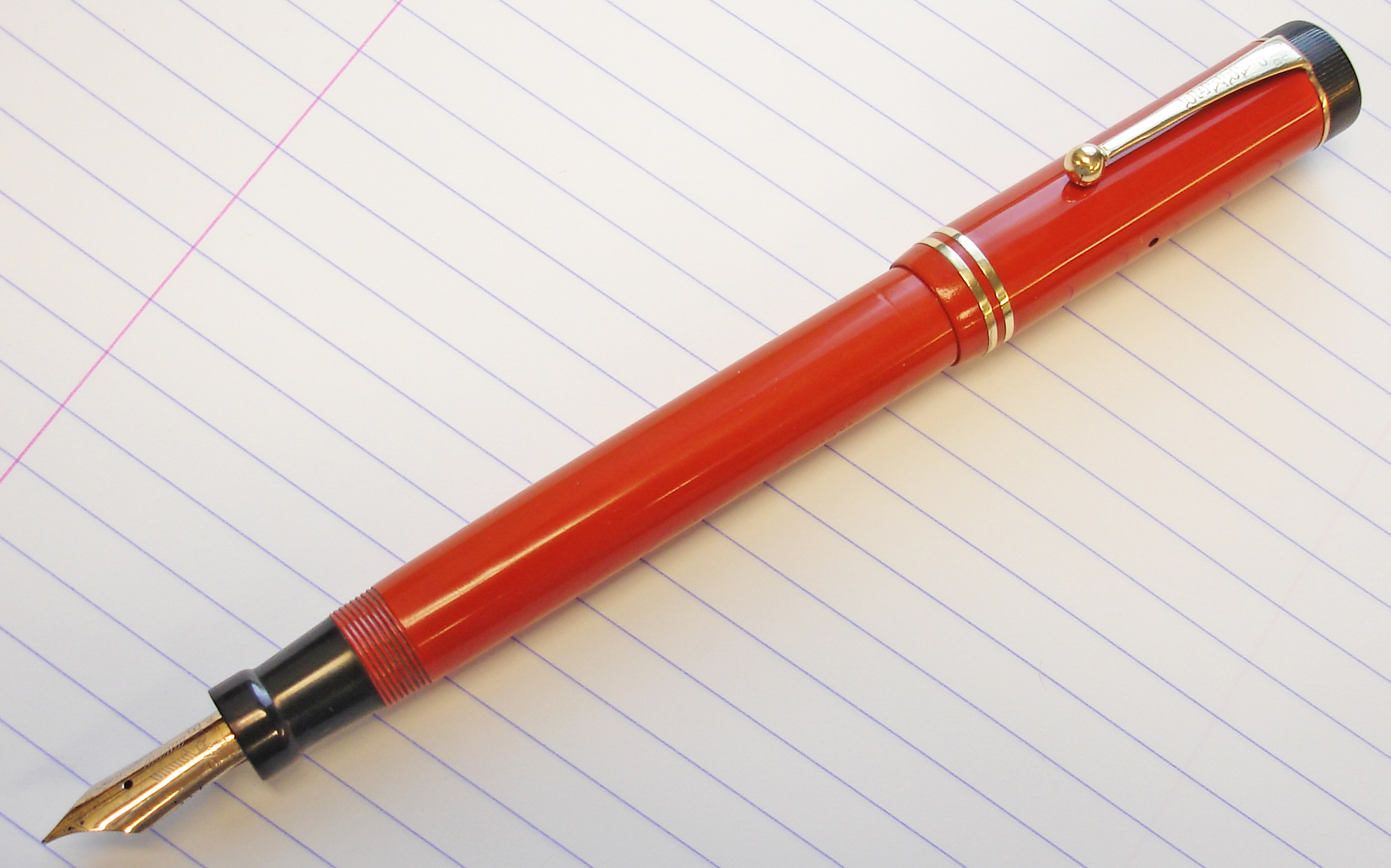
Parker Duofold, ca. 1928

But by the early 1930s the Duofold’s design was viewed by the manufacturer as rather outmoded. Parker launched its replacement, the Vacumatic, in 1933, and the Duofold line was moved to second tier, even though it followed closely the Vacumatic's design with slimmer profile, streamlined look and vacumatic filling mechanism. Duofolds remained popular in Europe, being produced well into the 1960s in varying sizes and shades, and were revived in the 1980s as Parker's flagship offering once more. In 1988 (to celebrate the company's centennial), Parker launched the Duofold Centennial series of Pens (Fountain Pens, Rollerballs and Pencils). Later, they introduced the Duofold International line with models that also evoked the classic Duofold design, though smaller than the Centennial. There are also differences in the ink feeding systems, changing from their Button Filling mechanism to a cartridge/converter system.

On September 2, 1945, General Douglas MacArthur used a bright red 1928 Duofold to sign the Japanese Instrument of Surrender aboard USS Missouri (BB-63).
