= Parker 51 =

Fountain pen

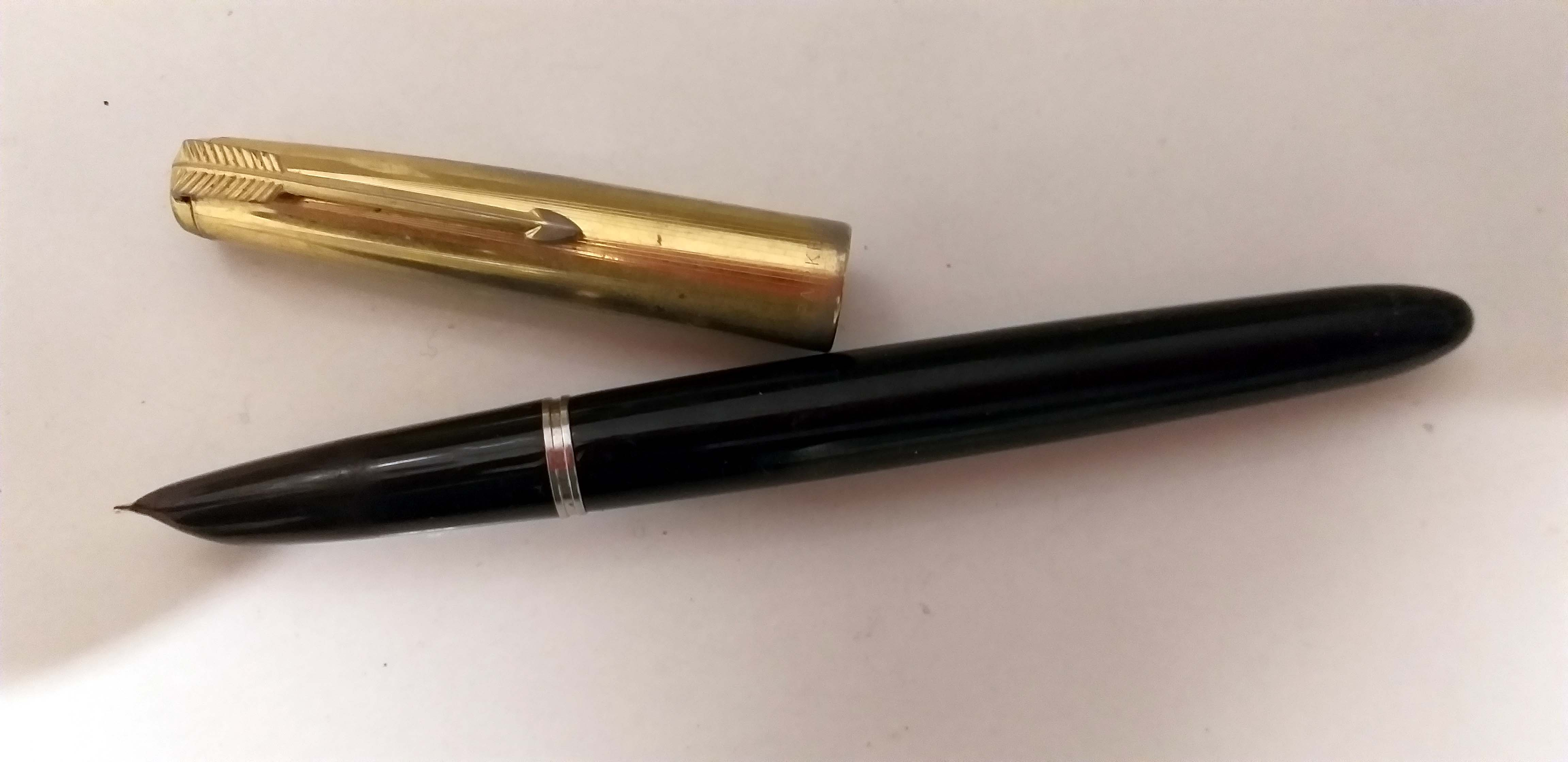
- An Argentine Parker 51
- Type: Fountain pen
- Inception: 1941; 85 years ago
- Manufacturer: Parker Pen Company
- Available: Yes
- Website: www.parkerpen.com/parker-51-pens.html

The Parker 51 is a fountain pen first introduced in 1941. Parker marketed it as "The World’s Most Wanted Pen", a slogan alluding to restrictions on production of consumer goods for civilian markets in the United States during World War II. Parker's continual advertising during the war created demand that took several years to fulfil after the end of the conflict.

The pen and the ink were both named "51" to mark 1939, the company's 51st anniversary, during which development for the pen was completed (U.S. design patent No. 116,097, U.S. patent 2,223,541 filed). By giving the pen a number instead of a name, Parker avoided the problem of translating a name into other languages.

== Design and history ==
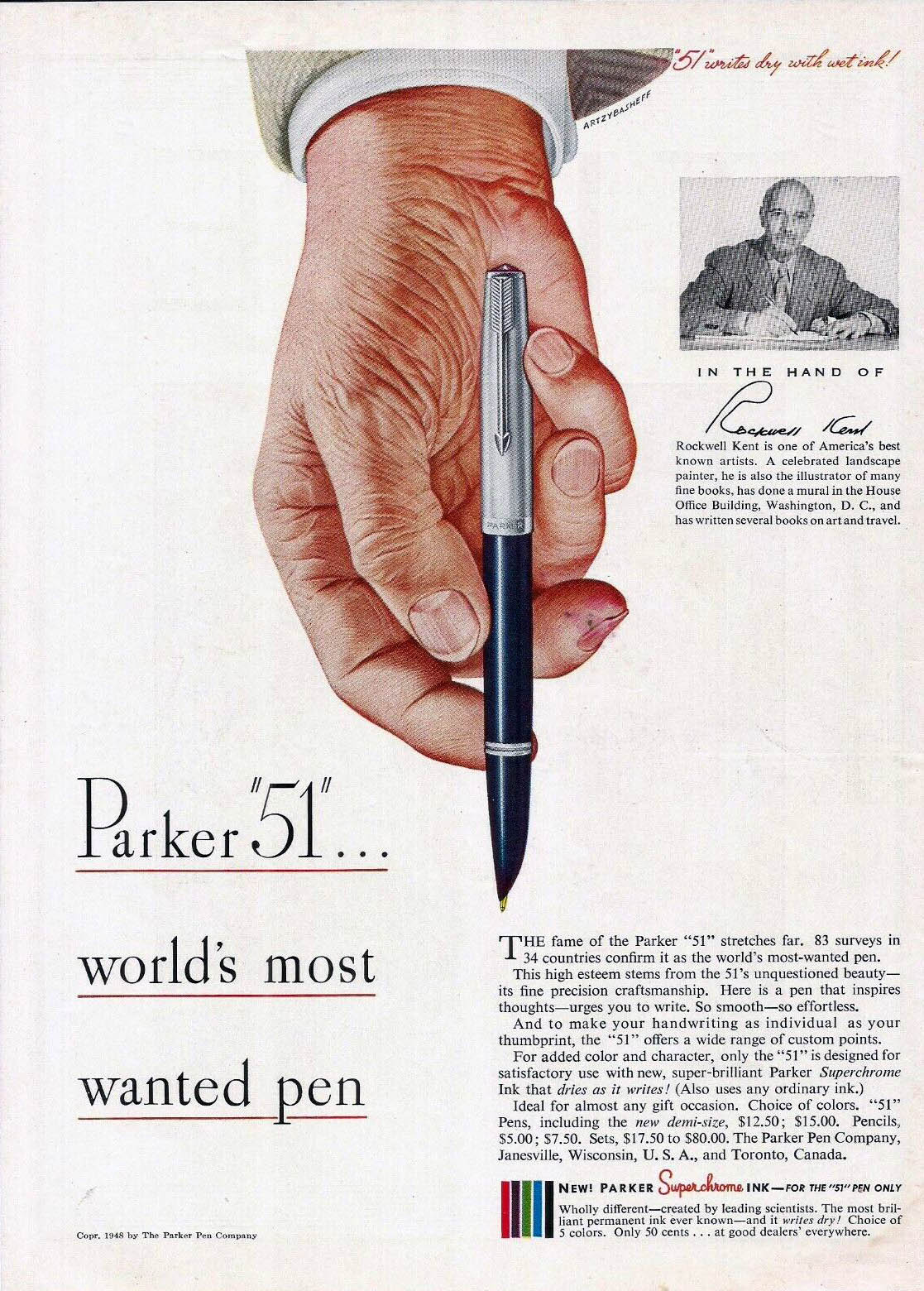
1948 ad for the Parker 51

The "51" was innovative for the period. It had a number of new design features—in particular the hooded, tubular nib and multi-finned collector were designed to work in conjunction with the pen's proprietary, fast-drying "51" ink. This allowed the tubular nib to stay wet and lay down an even line with either "51" ink or conventional inks. The initial model used a Vacumatic filling system which operated by pressing a plunger to generate a vacuum, drawing ink into the pen.

The filling system was re-designed in 1948, with the introduction of the Aerometric filling system. This filling system operated by pressing a pressure bar on "Pli-Glass" PVC sac.

In addition, Parker reformulated its 51 ink, reducing the alkalinity, introducing a selection of bright colors, and changing its name to Superchrome. Like the 51 ink, it also came with a warning that it should be used only in the Parker 51, though this warning was more discreet.

The pen was not named after the P-51 Mustang, a fighter plane. But Parker took advantage of the coincidence by comparing the pen and the aircraft in its advertising.

The Parker 51 stayed in production until 1972 with a series of revisions throughout its production cycle.

== Ink ==
There were two iterations of a special ink formulated exclusively for use in the Parker 51.

This initial ink was highly alkaline and while water-based, also contained a substantial amount of isopropyl alcohol.

It was released in 1941 as 51 ink, along with the Parker 51 pen. Parker was careful to print prominent warnings on caps, labels, and boxes that the ink could only be used in the 51. The formulation in the ink would react with other manufacturing materials (such as celluloid) of the period leading to irreparable damage to other fountain pens. In 1948, the '51' ink was withdrawn and replaced with "Superchrome" ink, also advertised for the '51' pen and its economy model, the Parker 21 as the ink would still harm other fountain pens. "Superchrome" was discontinued by the early 1960s. Although Parker no longer manufactures these specially formulated inks, the pen's construction is suitable for most modern inks, such as Parker's Quink.

== Legacy ==
A pilot who was suspected of falsifying flight records in their logbook in order to overstate their actual experience was said to have logged "P-51 hours".

The 51 is popular with pen collectors, and in 2002 Parker issued a lookalike model called the 51 Special Edition. In 2004, the Parker 100 was released. It was a larger and heavier version of the original Parker 51. The pen was designed by Geoff Hollington, a furniture designer who had previously collaborated with Parker in the Sonnet and Insignia models. The model was produced from 2004 to 2007 and was advertised as "the perfect combination of understated status and sharp, individual style". Parker 100 was offered in bronze, blue, white, silver, and black.

In 2021 a reimagined version of Parker 51 was released. The 2021 model had slight differences with its predecessor, being 4 mm longer than the original 51.

Queen Elizabeth II used a burgundy Parker 51 since the 1950s. Parker as a company has received a Royal warrant of appointment as the official providers of writing instruments for the Royal Family.
